= List of exoplanets and planetary debris around white dwarfs =

This is a list of exoplanets and planetary debris disks around white dwarfs.

== List of white dwarf exoplanets ==
=== List of confirmed exoplanets ===
System name	Host star	Mass of planet (M_{J})	Semi-major axis (au)	Discovery method	Discovery year	Note	Reference
WD 0806-661	single	1.5-8	2500	direct imaging	2011	WD 0806-661 B can be interpreted as either a sub-brown dwarf or an exoplanet.	
WD J0914+1914	metal-polluted single		0.070 to 0.074	detection of accreted planet material via spectroscopy	2019	likely ice giant	
WD 1856+534	single	>0.84	0.019	transiting	2020	the white dwarf co-moves with G 229-20 A/B	
MOA-2010-BLG-477L	single	1.4±0.3	2.8±0.5	microlensing	2012/2021	a Jupiter-analogue	
KMT-2020-BLG-0414	single	0.0060±0.0006	2.1±0.2	microlensing	2021/2024	1.9 earth-mass planet, also has a brown dwarf at 22 au	
QZ Serpentis	white dwarf+K4 star	0.63	0.019	detection via "very long photometric period" (VLPP)	2022	has an orbital period of 1 day.	

=== List of candidate exoplanets ===
System name	Host star	Status	Mass of planet (M_{J})	Semi-major axis (au)	Discovery method	Discovery year	Note	Reference
GD 356	single	rejected candidate	<12		variability and missing IR-excess	2010	115 minute variability, iron-rich terrestrial planet was suspected to electromagnetically interacting with the white dwarf, no orbiting body was detected, rejecting the idea of an unipolar inductor model	
GD 140	single	suspected	3.74+1.43 −0.90		anomaly in the Hipparcos-Gaia proper motion	2019	mass is estimated for separation of 5 AU, to be observed with JWST	
LAWD 37	single	suspected	0.60+0.23 −0.15		anomaly in the Hipparcos-Gaia proper motion	2019	mass is estimated for separation of 5 AU, to be observed with JWST	
GD 394	metal-polluted single	candidate			EUV variability	2019	either a metal accretion spot that disappeared or an evaporating planet at a 1.15 day orbit, with a hydrogen-cloud around the planet transiting in front of the white dwarf	
WD 0141-675	metal-polluted single	candidate	9.26+2.64 −1.15		Gaia DR3 stellar multiples/radial velocity	2023	rejected due to software error 33.65 ± 0.05 day period. ESPRESSO radial velocity observations however possibly detects a planet with a 16 day period	
WD 1202−232 (LP 852-7)	metal-polluted single	rejected candidate	1–7	11.47	direct imaging	2024	similar to solar system giant planets in age and separation, no common proper motion and therefore faint background galaxy	
WD 2105−82 (LAWD 83)	metal-polluted single	candidate	1.4+0.4 −0.2	<4	infrared excess	2025	first multi-planet system if confirmed, emission by a disk possible, but planet interpretation is seen more likely, confirmed common proper motion of the excess	
WD 2105−82 (LAWD 83)	metal-polluted single	rejected candidate	1–2	34.62	direct imaging	2024	similar to solar system giant planets in age and separation, no common proper motion and therefore faint background galaxy	
GALEX J071816.4+373139	massive single	candidate	3.6		infrared excess	2024	planet candidate has a temperature of about 400 K	
WD 0310-688 (CPD-69 177)	metal-polluted single	candidate	3.0+5.5 −1.9	0.1-2	infrared excess	2024	planet candidate has a temperature of 248+84 −61 K	
HS 0209+0832	metal-polluted single	candidate			detection of accreted planet material via spectroscopy	2024	metals in agreement with second-generation giant planet, period of 4.4 days from TESS, enriched in zinc, copper and niobium	
Sirius B	white dwarf+A0V star	candidate	1.5	0.9	astrometry	2024	has a mass range of 0.8-2.4 Jupiter masses.	
WD 2226-210	single	candidate		0.034	transiting	2024	orbits the central white dwarf of the Helix Nebula, has a radius of 1 R_{J} or 2.3 R_{🜨}	
WD 2226-210	single	candidate	1	0.004	accreted material from the planet	2025	X-ray signal might have a period of 2.9 hours. Estimated to have been Jupiter-like. Mid-IR excess was interpreted as a disk or cloud formed by disrupted comets in the past.	
WD 2149+021 (EGGR 150)	metal-polluted single	candidate	3+3 −2	<8	infrared excess	2025	emission by a disk possible, but planet interpretation is seen more likely	
MEAD 62 (2MASS J09424023-4637176)	single	candidate	14.7+2.1 −3.1	40	direct imaging	2025	cold exoplanet or brown dwarf, would have orbited at 18 AU during the main-sequence, Y dwarf candidate	
WD 0644+025	metal-polluted single	candidate	6.8		infrared excess	2026	around a massive white dwarf with metal pollution, could also be infrared excess from a disk, but disk models produce a poor fit.	

=== List of exoplanets detected via timing ===
Circumbinary exoplanets found with eclipse timing variations are sometimes listed as confirmed planets. The models describing these planets do however often fail to predict eclipse timing and the timing variation could be caused by other effects, such as magnetic effects. Due to the high number of objects detected via timing, this list was separated from the above lists.

System name	Host star	Mass of planet (M_{J})	Semi-major axis (au)	Discovery method	Discovery year	Note	Reference
PSR B1620-26	white dwarf+pulsar	2.5±1	23	pulsar timing	1993		
DP Leonis	white dwarf+donor star	6.28	8.19	eclipse timing variations	2009	has a size of 1.14 R_{J}	
NN Serpentis	PCEB: white dwarf+red dwarf	6.91±0.54	5.38±0.20	eclipse timing variation	2010	PCEB is surrounded by a dusty disk, might be only one planet	
NN Serpentis	PCEB: white dwarf+red dwarf	2.28±0.38	3.39±0.10	eclipse timing variation	2010	PCEB is surrounded by a dusty disk, might be only one planet	
UZ Fornacis	white dwarf+red dwarf	6.3	5.9	eclipse timing variations	2011	planet b & c	
UZ Fornacis	white dwarf+red dwarf	7.7	2.8	eclipse timing variations	2011	planet b & c	
HU Aquarii	white dwarf+M4.5V star	5.9	3.6	eclipse timing variations	2011	planet b & c	
HU Aquarii	white dwarf+M4.5V star	4.5	5.4	eclipse timing variations	2011	planet b & c	
RR Caeli (AB)	white dwarf+dM star	3.0	5.2	eclipse timing variations	2021	planet b	
RR Caeli (AB)	white dwarf+dM star	2.7	9.7	eclipse timing variations	2021	planet c	
SDSS J1208+3550	single	9.5	0.00213	timing	2013	orbits its star in slightly less than an hour	
SDSS J1730+5545	single	6	0.00139	timing	2014	orbits its star in 35 minutes.	
DE Canum Venaticorum	white dwarf+M3V star	12.0293	5.75	eclipse timing variations	2018	has a size of 1.1 R_{J}	
Candidates
LX Serpentis (AB)	white dwarf+M3V star	7.5	9.1	timing	2016	also known as Stepanian's Star	
DW Ursae Majoris	white dwarf+M3V star	10.06	5.8	timing	2016	accretion disk in the system	
GK Virginis	white dwarf+red dwarf	0.95	7.38	timing	2020	eclipsing binary	
KPD 0005+5106	X-ray single	1		timing	2021	Jupiter-analogue, has the same exact size and mass of Jupiter.	
PSR J0337+1715 (AB) b	pulsar+2 white dwarfs	0.03		pulsar timing	2022	Similar in mass to Neptune's moon Triton	

=== List of transiting debris or minor planets ===
System name	Metal pollution	Type of transiting object	Semi-major axis (R_{☉})	Discovery method	Discovery Year	Note	Ref.
WD 1145+017	yes	minor planet	1.16	transiting	2015		
SDSS J1228+1040	yes	no transiting object	0.73	variable Calcium absorption line	2019	planetesimal might orbit within the debris disk of the white dwarf	
WD 0145+234	yes	no transiting object	1.29	tidal disruption event	2019	one asteroid disrupted in 2018	
ZTF J0139+5245	yes	debris cloud	77.4	transiting	2020	highly eccentric orbit (e>0.97)	
ZTF J0328-1219	yes	2 debris clumps	b: 2.11 c: 2.28	transiting	2021		
SDSS J0107+2107	yes	debris		transiting	2021		
ZTF J0347−1802		debris		transiting	2021	transit duration of about 70 days	
ZTF J0923+4236		debris		transiting	2021	period in the order of days, variation in the order of hours, vast long-term variation of transit numbers and depth	
SBSS 1232+563	yes	debris		transiting	2021	deep, but sporadic dips, had an about 8-month long nearly 50% deep transit for most of 2023, orbital period of debris might be 14.8 hours	
WD 1054-226	yes	many debris clouds	3.69	transiting	2022	disk detected in transit, variable with a period of 25.02 hours	
WD J0923+7326	yes	debris		transiting	2025	Long and short-term variability with the strongest variability in the sample.	
WD J1013−0427	yes	fine grained debris		transiting	2025	Also shows calcium emission lines, indicative of a thick eccentric gas disk. Also shows reddening during the dip, indicative of small grain dust grains (radius ≤0.3 μm). One long dip, lasting two years. Recurrence of the transit limited to 20 years. Transit either caused by the collision of two planets at 6 AU or a precessing disk (similar to SDSS J1228+1040). Helium-dominated atmosphere, with H, Ca, Si and Mg. Will be studied in another paper in detail.	
WD J1237+5937	yes	debris from asteroid-fragment collision?		transiting	2025	One long-timescale dip, lasting 4 months. No variability in the high-speed follow-up. The researchers suggest that the transit was caused by the collision of two asteroid fragments on an eccentric orbit, producing debris on a long-term orbit. Several metal absorption lines: Ca, Mg, Fe, Al.	
WD J1302+1650	yes	debris		transiting	2025	One long-lasting dip feature and nearly continuous and irregular variability in follow-up (similar to WD 1054−226). Shows also hydrogen in a helium-dominated atmosphere.	
WD J1650+1443	yes	debris		transiting	2025	Low-amplitude variability.	
WD J1944+4557	yes	debris		transiting	2025	Sporadic, but prominent dips. Will be studied in an upcoming paper.	

== List of planetary debris around white dwarfs ==
About 6% of white dwarfs show infrared excess due to a disk around a white dwarf. In the past only a relative small sample of white dwarf disks was known. Due to advances in white dwarf detection (e.g. with Gaia or LAMOST) and improvement of WISE infrared catalogs with unWISE/CatWISE, the number has increased to hundreds of candidates. Therefore this list will be limited to disks with metal gas emission and notable systems.

=== Notable systems with planetary debris ===
System name	Host temperature (K)	Likely planetary body accreted	Infrared excess	Metal absorption/emission lines	Discovery year	Notes and References
van Maanen 2	6,130		no	Ca, Fe, Mg, Cr, Ni, Na, Si	1917	first metal absorption line (calcium) discovered in a white dwarf
G 29-38	11,600	chondritic object	yes	C, O, Mg, Si, Ca, Ti, Cr, Fe, silicates	1987/2005	first confirmed disk
GD 362	9,740	asteroid with earth/Moon-like composition	yes	Ca, Na, Mg, Al, Si, Sc, Ti, V, Cr, Mn, Fe, Co, Ni, Cu, Sr, C, silicates	2005	second confirmed disk
WD 1425+540	14,490	exo-Kuiper Belt Object	no	C, N, O, Mg, Si, S, Ca, Fe, Ni	2017	first nitrogen detected in a white dwarf, likely an exo-KBO
SDSS 1557	21,800	object larger than 4 km	yes	Mg, Ca, Si	2011/2017	white dwarf with a brown dwarf in a ultra-short orbit (2.27 hrs) and a circumbinary disk around the binary
WD J2356−209	4,040	sodium-rich body?	no	Na, Mg, Ca, Fe	2001/2019	strong and broad sodium feature
WD J1644–0449	3,830	meteoritic composition, except for Lithium	no	Li, Na, K, Ca	2021	The first identification of lithium and potassium in a white dwarf, similar discoveries slightly later
WD 2317+1830	4,210 or 4,557	primitive planetesimal	yes	Li, Na, Ca	2021	Coldest and oldest (9.5 Gyrs) white dwarf with a detected disk. Also one of the most massive white dwarfs with a disk. A newer work finds higher temperature and lower age (6.4 Gyrs).
LSPM J0207+3331	6,120	massive differentiated rocky body with large planetary core	yes	Na, Mg, Al, Si, Ca, Ti, Cr, Mn, Fe, Co, Ni, Cu, Sr, silicates?	2021	highly polluted old white dwarf
GALEX J2339–0424	13,735	exomoon	no	Be, O, Mg, Si, Ca, Ti, Cr, Mn, Fe	2021	one of two white dwarfs with the first detection of beryllium, possibly due to exomoon accretion
GD 424	16,560	CI chondrite + water-rich body	no	O, Mg, Al, Si, Ca, Ti, Cr, Mn, Fe, Ni	2021	mainly polluted by a rocky body, but also shows a large amount of trace-hydrogen, which could have come from a past accretion of a water-rich body
G238-44	20,000	iron-rich Mercury-like object + Kuiper Belt Object	no	C, N, O, Mg, Al, Si, P, S, Ca, Fe	2022	unusual composition, showing that it accreted an iron-rich Mercury-like object and an icy KBO
WD 1054–226	7,910		no	Mg, Al, Ca, Fe	2022	disk detected in transit
WD J2147–4035	3,048		no	Na, K, Li, C?	2022	coldest white dwarf with metal-pollution, with a cooling age of 10 Gyrs, magnetic white dwarf
WD 0956+5912	8,720	Moon-sized object	no	Na, Mg, Al, Si, Ca, Ti, Cr, Fe, Ni	2023	recent accretion of a Moon-sized object
PHL 5038	7,525		no	Ca	2009/2024	brown dwarf around the white dwarf is likely responsible for scattering a minor planet towards the white dwarf, first such system discovered
WD 0816–310	6,250	Vesta-sized object, likely chrondritic	no	Na, Mg, Ca, Cr, Mn, Fe, Ni	2024	First observation of metals being guided by magnetic fields towards the magnetic poles
SBSS 1612+554 (J1613+5521)	12,000	3 × 10^{19} g of material (about the mass of 243 Ida)	yes	silicates	2019/2025	Strongest silicate feature around any star or white dwarf detected (as of January 2025). Ongoing collisions must produce sub-micron sized particles to explain the feature.
GD 85 (J0719+4021)	17,000		yes	possibly Ca?, glassy silica	1988/2025	One of three white dwarfs with glassy or amorphous silica detected. Indicating a high-temperature process and rapid cooling. Proposed formation processes include the formation of obsidian, tektites or processes involving the production and re-condensation of SiO gas.
UCAC4 077-007106 (J0707−7438)	17,000		yes	iron?, alloys?	2025	Probably dominated by metallic iron and alloys. One of the hottest debris with a temperature of 2040 Kelvin.
PG 1647+376 (WD 1647+375)	22,040	Kuiper-Belt object? Part of a planetesimal? Interstellar object?	yes	C, N, O, Al, Si, S, Fe, Mg	2025	Rich in C, N, S.

=== Gaseous disks ===
System name	Host temperature (K)	Disk inner radius (radius white dwarf = Rwd)	Disk outer radius (Rwd)	Infrared excess	Metal absorption lines	Metal emission lines	Disk discovery year	Notes and References
WD 1226+110	22,020	26	93	yes	Mg, Ca, Si, O, C	Ca, Fe	2006/2009	has minor planet
WD 1041+091	17,912	18	38	yes	C, O, Mg, Al, Si, P, S, Ca, Fe, Ni	Ca	2007	possibly differentiated carbonate-rich body
WD 0738+1835	13,600	12	21	yes	O, Na, Mg, Si, Ca, Fe	Ca	2010	Ceres-sized body with bulk-earth composition
WD 0842+231	18,600	13	187	yes	H, C, O, Si, Fe, Mg, Al, Ca, Cr, Mn, Ni	Ca	2010	object enhanced in iron, nickel, and maybe carbon, at least 100 km in diameter, eccentric disk, possibly maintained by a planet
WD 0959-0200	13,280	10	25	yes	Mg, Ca	Ca	2012	
WD 1349-230	17,000	13	35	yes	Ca	Ca	2012	
WD 1617+1620	13,432	9	20	yes		Ca	2012	
WD 1344+0324	26,071	90	105	yes		Ca	2017	coldest debris disk discovered at the time
WD 0145+234	13,000	13?	24?	yes		Ca, carbonates?	2019	TDE of a minor planet, might had water in the past
WD 0006+2858	26,000	20	64	yes	C, O, S, P, Mg, Al, Si, Ca	Ca, O, Fe, Mg, Fe, Si	2020	
WD 0347+1624	20,620			yes	Ca, Mg, Al	Ca, O, Fe	2020	
WD 0510+2315	21,700			yes	O, S, Mg, Al, Si, Ca	O, Mg, Ca, Fe	2020	
WD 0611-6931	16,550	10	165	yes	Ca, C, O, S, P, Mg, Al, Si, Fe, Ni	Ca, O, Fe, Si, Na, Mg	2020	
WD 0644-0352	20,850			yes	Ca, H, O, Mg, Al, Si, Ti, Cr, Fe	Ca	2020	possibly some water in the parent body
WD 1622+5840	19,560			yes	Ca, H, C, O, S, P, Mg, Al, Si, Fe, Ni	Ca, O, Fe	2020	
WD 2100+2122	25,320	33	57	yes	Ca, Mg, Al, Si, Fe	Ca, Fe, O, Mg, Si	2020	
WD 0846+5703	17,803			yes	Si, Mg	Ca, Mg, Fe	2021	exceptionally strong infrared excess
WD 0234-0406	12,454			yes	Mg, O, Ca, Al, Ti, Fe	Ca, Mg/Fe	2021	possibly water containing object accreted
WD 0529-3401	23,197			yes	Mg, Si, Ca	H, Ca, Mg, O, Fe	2021	strong suggestion of water-containing body due to emission of H, O
WD 1930-5028	13,306			yes	Mg, Ca	Ca, Mg, Fe	2021	
WD 2133+2428	29,282			yes		Ca, O	2021	hottest white dwarf with a gaseous disk
WD 2212-1352	13,454			yes	Mg, Si, C, Ca, Al, Fe	Ca, Mg, Fe	2021	
WD J1013−0427	21,900	18.2	47.9	no	H, Ca, Si, Mg	Ca	2025	Also shows transiting debris.
WD J1328−1450	17,424	inner: 9.3 outer: 36	inner: 23 outer: 129	yes	Ca, Mg, Si	Ca, O, Mg, Fe	2026	Double disk created by two planetary bodies

== See also ==
- Confirmed brown dwarf orbiting stellar remnants
- List of white dwarfs
- Timeline of white dwarfs, neutron stars, and supernovae
- List of exoplanet extremes
- List of exoplanet firsts
- Second generation planet
