= WD 1856+534 =

White dwarf located in the constellation Draco

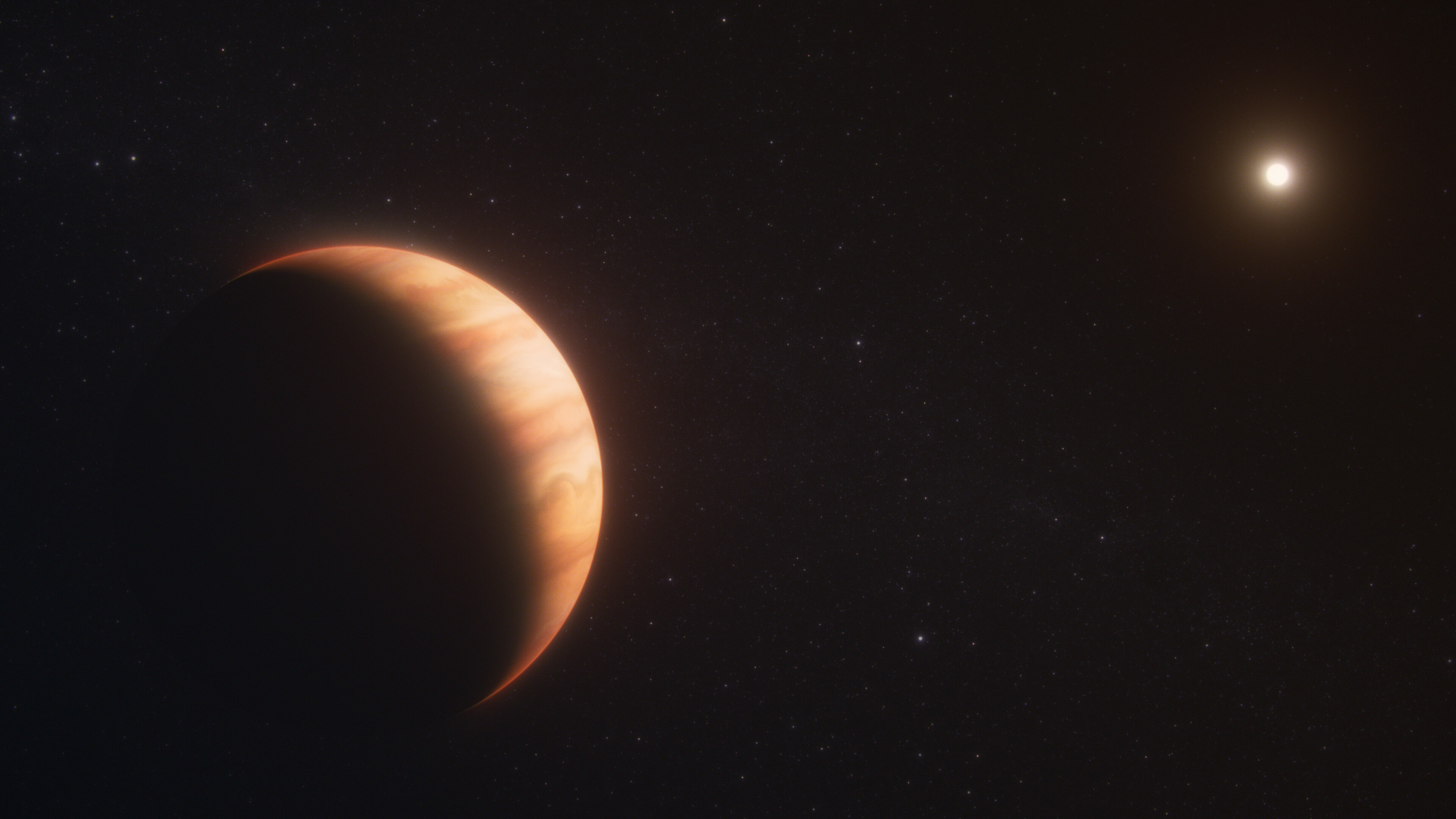
- Artist's impression of WD 1856+534 and its planet.

Observation data Epoch J2000 Equinox J2000
- Constellation: Draco
- WD 1856+534
- Right ascension: 18^{h} 57^{m} 39.344^{s}
- Declination: +53° 30′ 33.30″
- Apparent magnitude (V): 17.244±0.046
- G 229-20 A
- Right ascension: 18^{h} 57^{m} 37.960^{s}
- Declination: +53° 31′ 15.25″
- Apparent magnitude (V): 13.15
- G 229-20 B
- Right ascension: 18^{h} 57^{m} 37.911^{s}
- Declination: +53° 31′ 12.92″
- Apparent magnitude (V): 13.23

Characteristics

WD 1856+534
- Evolutionary stage: white dwarf
- Spectral type: DA
- Apparent magnitude (J): 15.677±0.055
- Apparent magnitude (H): 15.429±0.094
- Apparent magnitude (K): 15.548±0.186

G 229-20
- Evolutionary stage: red dwarf + red dwarf
- Spectral type: M3.5V

Astrometry

WD 1856+534
Proper motion (μ)	RA: +240.749 mas/yr Dec.: −52.470 mas/yr
Parallax (π)	40.3931±0.0506 mas
Distance	80.7 ± 0.1 ly (24.76 ± 0.03 pc)
Absolute magnitude (M_{V})	+14.37

G 229-20 A
Radial velocity (R_{v})	17.19±0.33 km/s
Proper motion (μ)	RA: +256.055 mas/yr Dec.: −52.810 mas/yr
Parallax (π)	40.3480±0.0149 mas
Distance	80.84 ± 0.03 ly (24.784 ± 0.009 pc)

G 229-20 B
Radial velocity (R_{v})	17.38±0.35 km/s
Proper motion (μ)	RA: +241.527 mas/yr Dec.: −44.335 mas/yr
Parallax (π)	40.3648±0.0147 mas
Distance	80.80 ± 0.03 ly (24.774 ± 0.009 pc)

Position (relative to G 229-20)
Angular distance	~43″
Projected separation	1030+130 −55 AU

Details

WD 1856+534
Mass	0.605±0.013 M_{☉}
Radius	0.0121±0.0002 R_{☉}
Luminosity	0.000077 L_{☉}
Surface gravity (log g)	8.05±0.02 cgs
Temperature	4,920±50 K
Metallicity [Fe/H]	<−8.8 dex
Age	Cooling age: 5.4±0.7 Gyr; Total age: 7.4 to 10 Gyr

G 229-20 A
Mass	0.335±0.024 M_{☉}
Radius	0.35±0.02 R_{☉}
Luminosity	0.016 L_{☉}
Temperature	3,521 K

G 229-20 B
Mass	0.322±0.023 M_{☉}
Radius	0.34±0.02 R_{☉}
Luminosity	0.015 L_{☉}
Temperature	3,513 K

Other designations
- WDS J18576+5331
- WD 1856+534: LP 141-14, LSPM J1857+5330, NLTT 47263, TOI-1690, TIC 267574918, 2MASS J18573936+5330332
- G 229-20: LP 141-13, LSPM J1857+5331, NLTT 47260/47261, 2MASS J18573793+5331140

Database references
SIMBAD	WD 1856+534
- G 229-20
- G 229-20 A
- G 229-20 B
Exoplanet Archive	data

WD 1856+534 is a white dwarf located in the constellation of Draco. At a distance of about 25 parsecs (80 ly) from Earth, it is the outer component of a visual triple star system consisting of an inner pair of red dwarf stars, named G 229-20. The white dwarf displays a featureless absorption spectrum, lacking strong optical absorption or emission features in its atmosphere. It has an effective temperature of 4,700 K (4,430 °C; 8,000 °F), corresponding to an age of approximately 5.8 billion years. WD 1856+534 is approximately half as massive as the Sun, while its radius is much smaller, being 40% larger than Earth.

== Planetary system ==
The white dwarf is known to host one exoplanet, WD 1856+534 b (short name: WD 1856 b), in orbit around it. The exoplanet was detected through the transit method by the Transiting Exoplanet Survey Satellite (TESS) between July and August 2019. An analysis of the transit data in 2020 revealed that it is a Jupiter-like giant planet with a radius over ten times that of Earth's, and orbits its host star closely at a distance of 0.02 astronomical units (AU), with an orbital period 60 times shorter than that of Mercury around the Sun.

The unexpectedly close distance of the exoplanet to the white dwarf implies that it must have migrated inward after its host star evolved from a red giant to a white dwarf, otherwise it would have been engulfed by its star. This migration may be related to the fact that WD 1856+534 belongs to a hierarchical triple-star system: the white dwarf and its planet are gravitationally bound to a distant companion, G 229–20, which itself is a binary system of two red dwarf stars. Gravitational interactions with the companion stars may have triggered the planet's migration through the Lidov–Kozai mechanism in a manner similar to some hot Jupiters. An alternative hypothesis is that the planet instead has survived a common envelope phase. In the latter scenario, other planets engulfed before may have contributed to the expulsion of the stellar envelope. JWST observations seem to disfavour the formation via common envelope and instead favour high eccentricity migration.

The planetary transmission spectrum obtained with GTC OSIRIS is gray and featureless, likely because of the high level of hazes. The transmission spectrum was also obtained with Gemini GMOS. It does not show any features beside a possible dip at 0.55 μm. This feature could be caused be auroral emission at the nightside of the planet. The research find a minimum mass of 0.84 M_{J} by accounting for the transit geometry of a grazing transit. The researchers also revised the white dwarf parameters and found a total age of 8-10 billion years, in agreement with the system belonging to the thin disk.

Observations with the James Webb Space Telescope published in 2025 show an infrared excess from the star due to thermal emission by the planet, independently confirming its planetary nature. The observations constrain the planet's mass to be less than six times that of Jupiter, and indicate a temperature of 186+6
−7 K, making this the coldest exoplanet directly detected so far, beating out the previous record-holder, Epsilon Indi Ab.

One 2026 study analysing a JWST spectrum found hydrocarbons in the planetary atmosphere, as well as finding it to be carbon-rich. Their effective temperature of 390–412 K is higher than the equilibrium temperature of 160 K, indicating that tidal circularization heated the planet during the migration to its current orbit.

A search with transit timing variations found no additional planets. The search excluded planets with a mass more than 2 M_{J} with orbital periods as long as 500 days and planets with >10 M_{J} with orbital periods as long as 1000 days.

The WD 1856+534 planetary system
Companion (in order from star)	Mass	Semimajor axis (AU)	Orbital period (days)	Eccentricity	Inclination (°)	Radius
b	4.3–10.9 M_{J}	0.02085±0.0014	1.407939217(16)	~0	88.778±0.059	0.911±0.054 R_{J}

== See also ==
- WD 1145+017, a white dwarf with a transiting disrupted planetary-mass object
- WD J0914+1914, a white dwarf with a disk of debris originating from a possible giant planet
- ZTF J0139+5245, another white dwarf with a disk of debris from a disrupted planetary-mass object
- CWISEP J1935-1546, a free-floating object with aurora emission in the infrared
- List of exoplanets and planetary debris around white dwarfs
- PSR J0337+1715, a trinary compact star system with one pulsar and two white dwarfs. There is also a lunar-mass candidate orbiting all three of them at once
