= WD 1145+017 b =

Exoplanetary object orbiting around WD 1145+017

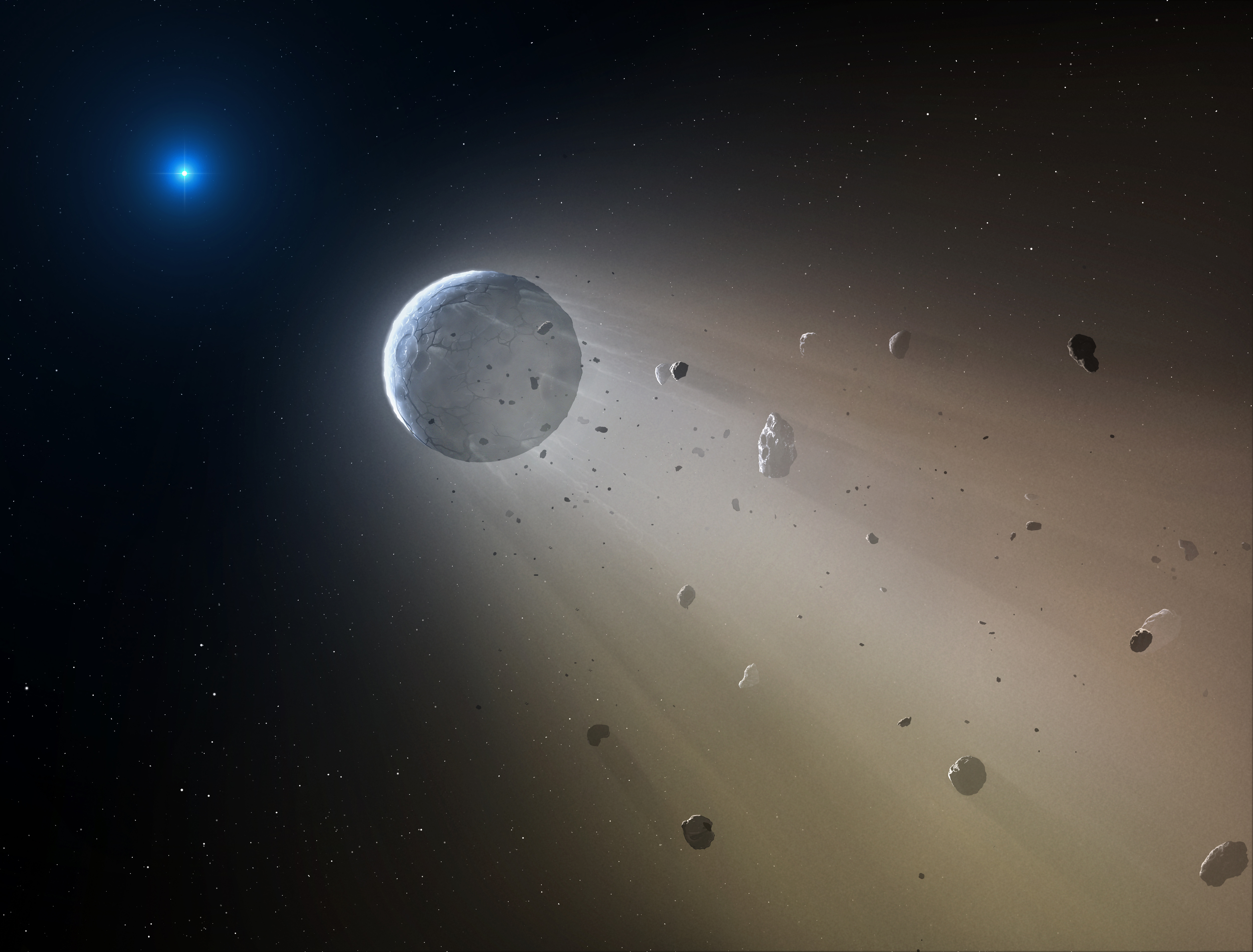
- Artist's impression of a minor planet (center) being vaporized by its parent star, similar to the WD 1145+017 system.

Discovery
- Discovered by: K2 (Kepler) mission
- Discovery date: 21 October 2015
- Detection method: Transit method

Orbital characteristics
- Semi-major axis: 0.0054 AU
- Orbital period (sidereal): 4.4989±0.0001 h 0.187454(4) d
- Star: WD 1145+017

Physical characteristics
- Mean radius: ~200 km
- Mass: ~0.000016 M_{🜨} (~0.1 M_{Ceres})

WD 1145+017 b (also known by its EPIC designation EPIC 201563164.01), is a confirmed exoasteroid or minor planet orbiting around and being vaporized by the white dwarf star WD 1145+017, likely one of multiple such objects around this star. It was discovered by NASA's Kepler spacecraft on its "Second Light" mission. It is located about 476 light-years (146 parsecs) away from Earth in the constellation of Virgo. The object was found by using the transit method, in which the dimming effect that a planet causes as it crosses in front of its star is measured.

The minor planet is notable because it is the first observed planetary object to transit a white dwarf, providing clues of its possible interactions when its parent star reached the end of its lifetime as a red giant. The object is also the least-massive exoplanetary object ever discovered, being about one-tenth the mass of the dwarf planet Ceres.

== Physical characteristics ==
=== Mass, radius, and temperature ===
WD 1145+017 b has been described as a minor planet, an asteroid, and a planetesimal. It likely has a surface temperature of around 4,000 K (3,730 °C; 6,740 °F) based on its extreme proximity to its star. Its mass and radius are not well known; it is thought to be about one-tenth the mass of Ceres and about 200 km in radius. The Extrasolar Planets Encyclopaedia claims a mass of 0.0006678 M_{🜨} for this object, 4.45 times the mass of Ceres and about the mass of Haumea, but this is not substantiated by the cited source (Croll et al. 2017), which considers the object to be Ceres-mass or less.

=== Host star ===
The planetary object orbits a (DB-type) white dwarf. It has ended its main sequence lifetime and will continue to cool for billions of years to come in the future. Based on recent studies and its mass, the star was likely an early A-type main sequence star with a mass of 2.46 M_{☉} and main sequence lifetime of 550 million years before it expanded and became a red giant. The star has a mass of 0.6 M_{☉} and a radius of 0.02 R_{☉} (1.4 R_{🜨}). It has a temperature of 15,020 K and is 774 million years old, with a cooling age of about 224 million years. In comparison, the Sun is 4.6 billion years old and has a surface temperature of 5778 K.

The star's apparent magnitude, or how bright it appears from Earth's perspective, is 17. Therefore, it is far too dim to be seen with the naked eye.

=== Orbit ===
WD 1145+017 b orbits its host star with an orbital period of 0.1875 days (4.5 hours) and an orbital radius of about 0.005 times that of Earth's (750,000 km), twice the distance between the Moon and the Earth or just over one solar radius, while Mercury orbits the Sun at about 0.38 AU (57 million km). It is one of the shortest orbital periods known so far, with several other exoplanets having shorter periods.

== Vaporization ==
WD 1145+047 b is currently being vaporized by its star because of its extreme proximity to it. White dwarfs are usually the size of the Earth, and have half as much mass as they did during the main sequence. Due to this and the searing hot temperature of the stellar remnant, rocky minerals are being vaporized off the surface of this object, into orbit around the star, which is responsible for a hot dusty disk that was observed around its host star. It is likely that WD 1145+017 b is bound to disintegrate in the future (around 100–200 million years from now) due to further vaporization and ablation. The minor planet is likely being pelted by several smaller objects of up to 90 kilometres (56 mi), as it is likely not just a single object orbiting the white dwarf star, but likely several planetesimals, which is probably responsible for some of the variations in the light curve data. The smaller objects can also throw debris into orbit upon impact, which may also be responsible for the variations.

In some way, it helps explain how a planetary system may evolve after its host star has thrown off its outer layers in a planetary nebula, eventually dying as a black dwarf.

== Discovery ==
The planetary object was discovered by the Kepler spacecraft on its secondary mission, K2: Second Light, an extension of its original mission from 2009 to 2013. Observations were taken over a period of about a month starting from April 2015 using the 1.2-meter telescope at the Fred L. Whipple Observatory along with another telescope located in Chile. The white dwarf star was not originally targeted as part of the mission, however data revealed that there were dips in this star's light curve, and as such investigations were made to figure out what was causing the dips, the same procedure that was used on the stars that were targeted by the K2 mission. Two transits were detected on 11 April over a period of 4 hours apart, and again on 17 April, however this one was 180° out of phase (inclination probably) from the 11 April transits. The spectra of WD 1145+047 was studied and it revealed that the star contained magnesium, aluminum, silicon, calcium, iron, and nickel. The settling times for these elements were much shorter than the cooling age of the white dwarf (175 Myr), so they must have been deposited fairly recently, as much as probably only 1–2 million years ago. It was suggested that this was evidence for a disintegrating rocky minor planet orbiting around WD 1145+047 with a low mass of one-tenth that of Ceres, comparable to the mass of some of the large asteroids in the Solar System.

The discovery was then published in the online journal Nature on 22 October 2015, describing the nature of the system.

== See also ==
- Disrupted planet
- GD 66 – white dwarf assumed to have an orbiting giant planet, but later ruled out
- Pulsar planet – type of planet that orbits another stellar remnant, a pulsar

Records
| Preceded by Kepler-37b | Least massive exoplanet 2015— | Succeeded by current |
| Preceded by Kepler-37b | Smallest-radius exoplanet 2015—2019 | Succeeded by SDSS J1228+1040 b |
