= SDSS J1228+1040 =

White dwarf in the constellation Virgo

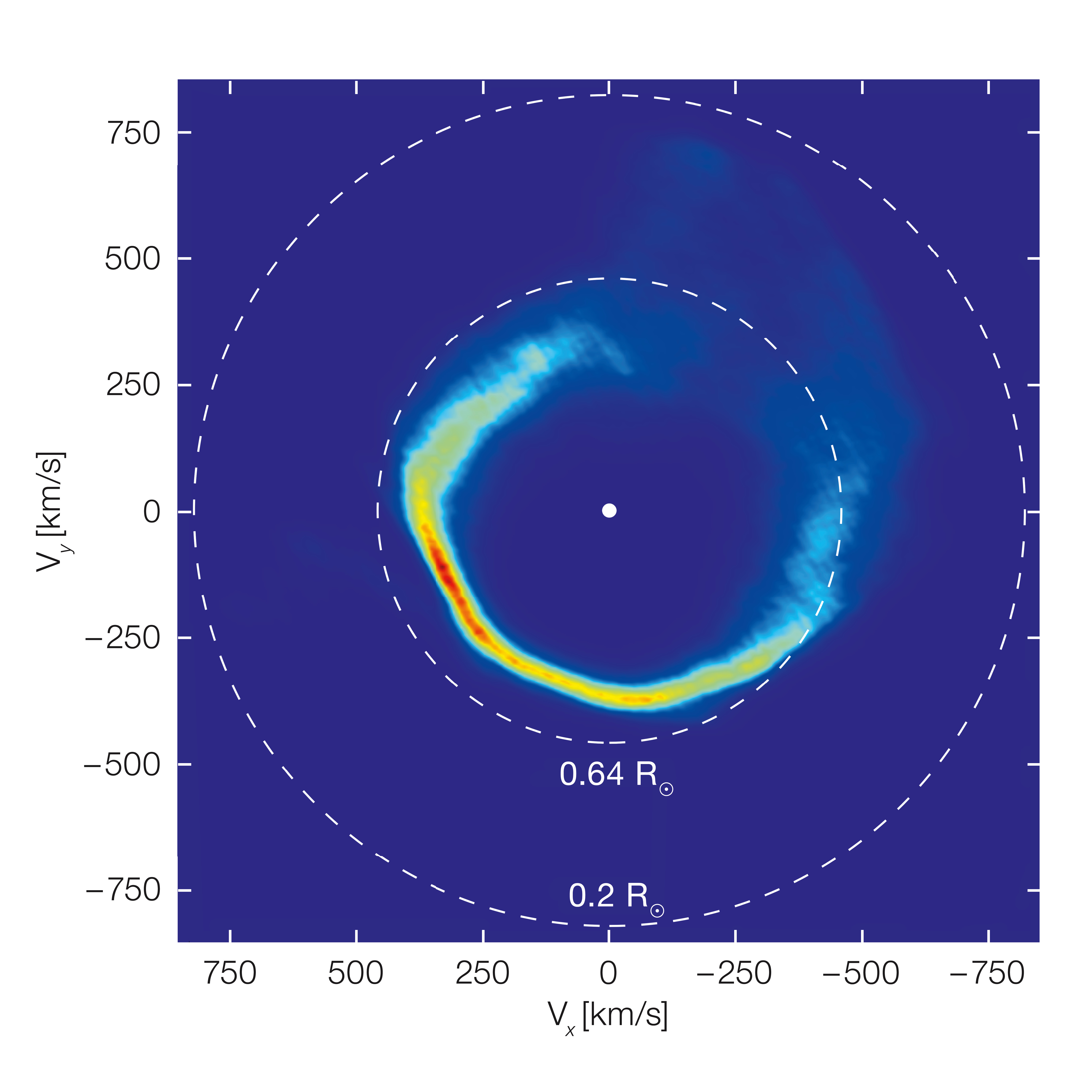
- Doppler imaging of the calcium gas around SDSS J1228+1040. The map is "inside-out", with the outer part being closer to the white dwarf Credit: University of Warwick/C. Manser/ESO

Observation data Epoch J2000 Equinox J2000
- Constellation: Virgo
- Right ascension: 12^{h} 28^{m} 59.934^{s}
- Declination: +10° 40′ 33.05″

Characteristics
- Evolutionary stage: white dwarf
- Spectral type: DAZ
- Apparent magnitude (G): 16.4

Astrometry
Proper motion (μ)	RA: −50.254±0.069 mas/yr Dec.: −24.729±0.049 mas/yr
Parallax (π)	7.7634±0.0662 mas
Distance	420 ± 4 ly (129 ± 1 pc)

Details
Mass	0.705±0.051 M_{☉}
Radius	0.01169±0.00078 R_{☉}
Luminosity	0.02266 (Note: Derived from known radius and temperature of star) L_{☉}
Surface gravity (log g)	8.150±0.089 cgs
Temperature	20,713±281 K
Age	cooling age: 100±5 Myr total age: 170 Myr

Other designations
- GALEX J122859.9+104032, WD 1226+110, WD 1226+109, LAMOST J122859.93+104032.9, SDSS J122859.93+104032.9, WIRED J122859.93+104032.9, WISE J122859.87+104032.8

Database references
SIMBAD	data

SDSS J1228+1040 (SDSS J122859.93+104032.9, WD 1226+110) is a white dwarf with a debris disk around it. The disk formed when a planetary body was tidally disrupted around the white dwarf. It is the first gaseous disk discovered around a white dwarf.

SDSS J1228+1040 was first identified as a white dwarf in 2006 from SDSS spectroscopic data. These observations identified it as a DA white dwarf, which indicates the detection of hydrogen.

== Gaseous disk ==
The gaseous disk was discovered in 2006, using data from the William Herschel Telescope. This gaseous disk was discovered by the emission of the calcium triplet at 850-866 nm and weaker emission due to iron at 502 nm and 517 nm. The double peak of the calcium triplet is seen as evidence of a rotating disk. The authors constrain the outer radius of the gaseous disk to 1.2 R_{☉}. The authors also find absorption due to magnesium. Additional elements in emission were detected in 2016. Hubble far-ultraviolet observations did not detect any emission-lines, which constrained the gaseous disk temperature to around 5000 K. The researchers modelled the disk to have a spiral shape.

In 2010 it was found that the calcium emission line changed between two epochs. The red side of the emission line complex switched to the blue side. This was first interpreted as a clumpy disk and the change in emission lines was seen as possible evidence of these clumps moving. Spectroscopic data from 2003 to 2015 were used for doppler imaging, which resolved the gaseous disk. The changes in calcium emission were interpreted as precession of the disk, with a period of 24-30 years. These timescales are in agreement with precession under the influence of general relativity. Modelling of the gaseous disk were carried out in 2021, finding an eccentricity of 0.188±0.004 and semi-major axis of 0.879±0.005 R_{☉} for the gas ring. The gaseous disk was modelled in detail in 2024, finding an inner disk radius of 0.57 R_{☉}, an outer radius of 1.7 R_{☉} and a peak emission at 1 R_{☉}. The disk shows eccentricity with the eccentricity of the inner edge being 0.44 and at the outer edge being nearly zero. The inclination is unconstrained in this work. The precession period was found to be 20.5 years. The researchers point out that the progenitor had a very eccentric orbit around the white dwarf, before it was disrupted. The precession should dissipate within around 200 years, meaning the disk is very young and should contain most of the mass of the progenitor, which they estimate to be 10^{21} g, equivalent to a body with a size of about 50 km.

In 2009 a dusty component was discovered, thanks to the detection of infrared excess. This discovery was made with observations from the Very Large Telescope, the United Kingdom Infrared Telescope and the Spitzer Space Telescope. The modelled dusty disk has an inner radius of 18 white dwarf radii and the outer radius is 107 white dwarf radii. The outer radius is similar to the gaseous disk radius of 108 white dwarf radii. The inner disk has a temperature of 1670 K and the outer disk has a temperature of 450 K. According to this work the disk has an inclination of around 70°. Later modelling found that the dusty disk has an inner temperature of 1,300±50 K, an outer temperature of 500±70 K. It was found that the disk is variable in infrared light. The 3.6 and 4.5 μm flux decreased by 20% from 2007 to 2014 and remained at this level until 2018.

Absorption and emission lines found around SDSS J1228+1040
Element	Absorption	Emission	Reference
calcium	yes	yes	
iron		yes	
magnesium	yes	yes	
oxygen	yes	yes	
silicon	yes		
carbon	yes		
aluminium	yes		
chromium	yes		
nickel	yes		

== Candidate planetesimal ==
A planetesimal, called SDSS 1228+1040 b, was suggested in 2019 as an explanation of a 123.4 minute variation of the calcium emission line. The researchers found that this planetesimal must be orbiting within the disk. The body was modelled to have a size of around 72 km. Another study does however attribute precession for the variability of the calcium emission line.

Unlike other planetesimals around white dwarfs, the planetesimal SDSS J1228+1040 b would need high internal strength and a high density to not be tidally disrupted. The researchers calculate a density of 7.7 g/cm^{3} or less. This density is close to the density of iron and it is speculated that this planetesimal is the core of a larger body. This larger parent body possibly got its crust and mantle stripped by the white dwarf, leaving the core behind. This crust and mantle material would then form the debris disk, which is now detected around the white dwarf.

At first the size of the planetesimal was estimated to be between 4 and 600 km or between 2 and 200 km for an eccentric orbit, but later accretion models suggest a minimal radius of 72 km and a lifetime of 1500 years before it is completely sublimated.

More recently, the existence of the planetesimal has been questioned, the alternative hypothesis being that the disk is precessing under the forces of general relativity and gas pressure. This eccentricity of the disk should dissipate within 200 years, meaning that the disk must have formed recently.

== Other gaseous white dwarf disks ==
Other gaseous disks were discovered. Especially Gaia helped in increasing this sample and these systems often also show variable emission lines, which could be a sign of precession in these disks.

== See also ==
- List of exoplanets and planetary debris around white dwarfs
- WD 0145+234, another gaseous white dwarf disk
- WD 1145+017, another white dwarf disk showing precession
- ZTF J0139+5245 – white dwarf with a highly eccentric planetesimal
