= WD 1054−226 =

White dwarf in the constellation Crater

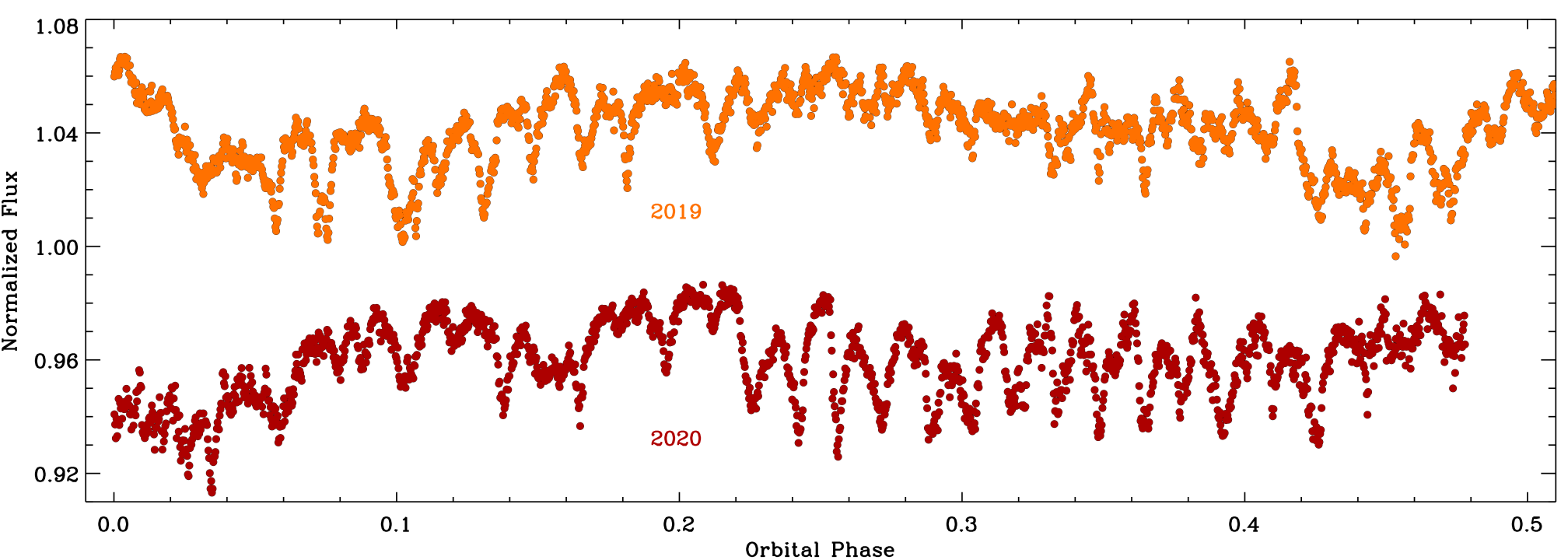
- phase-folded light curve of WD 1054−226 from ULTRACAM on the NTT in 2019 and 2020; Credit: Farihi et al. 2021

Observation data Epoch J2000 Equinox J2000
- Constellation: Crater
- Right ascension: 10^{h} 56^{m} 38.63^{s}
- Declination: −22° 52′ 56.08″
- Apparent magnitude (V): 16.0

Characteristics
- Evolutionary stage: white dwarf
- Spectral type: DAZ

Astrometry
Proper motion (μ)	RA: -78.865 ±0.047 mas/yr Dec.: 298.019 ±0.051 mas/yr
Parallax (π)	27.6511±0.0511 mas
Distance	118.0 ± 0.2 ly (36.16 ± 0.07 pc)

Details
Mass	0.62 ±0.05 M_{☉}
Radius	0.012 ±0.001 R_{☉}
Surface gravity (log g)	-3.27 ±0.09 cgs
Temperature	7910 ±120 K
Age	cooling age: 1.3 ±0.2 Gyr

Other designations
- LP 849-31, EC 10542−2236, GALEX J105638.5−225253, LEHPM 2-1372, LP 849-31, 2MASS J10563864−2252564, NLTT 25792, PSO J164.1606−22.8810, SDSS J105638.59−225254.3, TIC 415714190

Database references
SIMBAD	data

WD 1054−226, also known as LP 849-31, is a relatively cool magnitude 16 white dwarf star with a hydrogen atmosphere, in the small southern constellation of Crater located approximately 117 light years away at right ascension 10^{h} 57^{m} and declination −22° 53′ (J2000 epoch). The name WD 1054−226 is based on the coordinates in the J1950 epoch. The star was recognized as a white dwarf along with 32 other nearby white dwarfs (or double white dwarfs) in 2007.

In 2022 it was reported that the flux of light coming from the star varies continually due to partial obscuring by a ring. The pattern of variation repeats with little change every 25.02 hours. There are dips in the light flux every 23 minutes, exactly 65 per period of 25.02 hours. The explanation of this strong 65th harmonic is unknown and the authors of the paper say that the phenomenon is puzzling. It seems to be caused by clumps of matter orbiting the star. The researchers have hypothesized that the clumps are being influenced by a moon-sized object, possibly an exoplanet. If it has a period of 25 hours then it is orbiting in the habitable zone of the system. If this is confirmed, it would be the first time that a planet has been found orbiting in the habitable zone of a white dwarf.

== See also ==
- List of exoplanets and planetary debris around white dwarfs
- WD 1145+017 is the first white dwarf with transiting debris discovered
