= WD J0914+1914 =

White dwarf star in the constellation Cancer

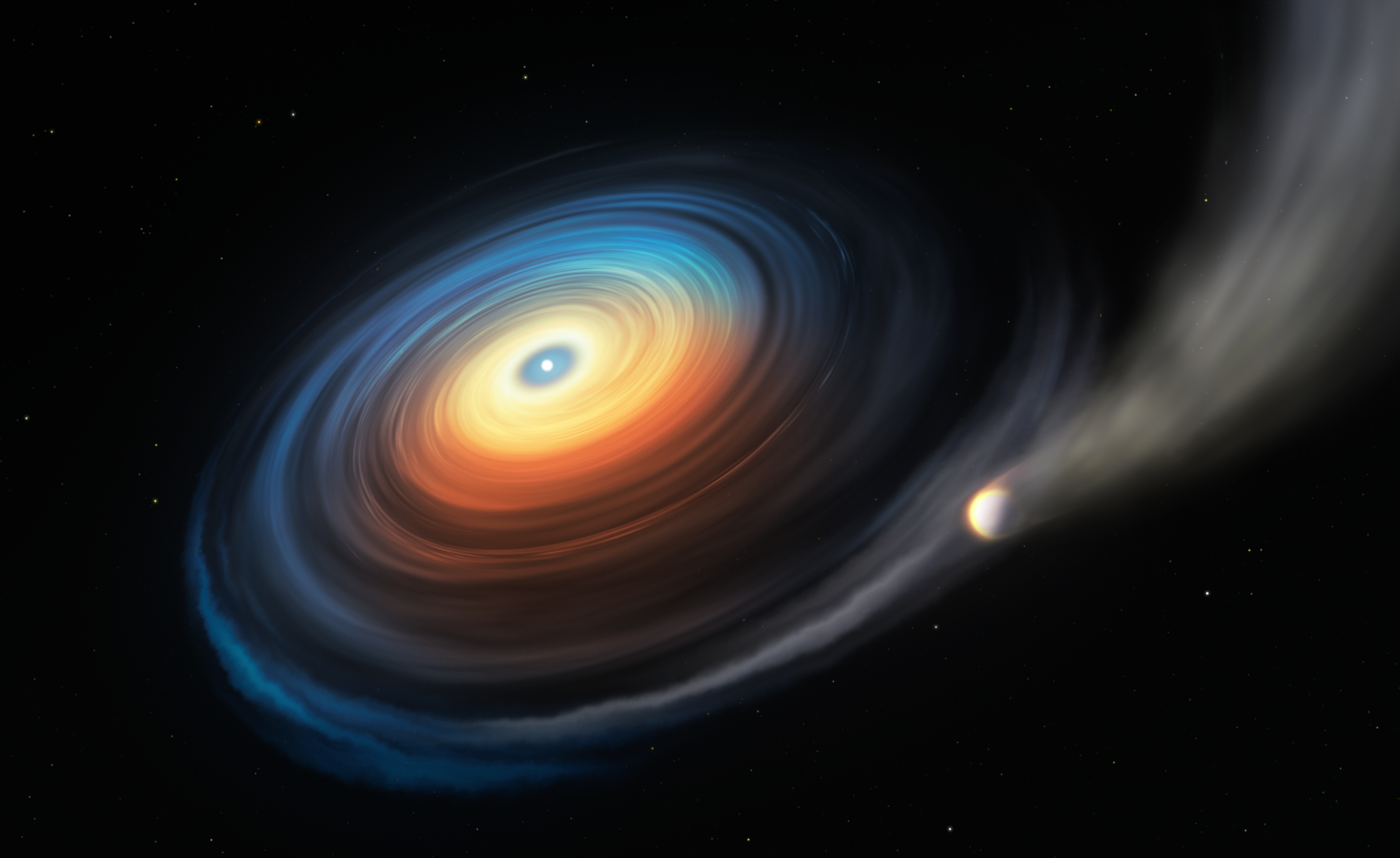
- White dwarf WD J0914+1914 and its Neptune-like exoplanet

Observation data Epoch J2000 Equinox ICRS
- Constellation: Cancer
- Right ascension: 09^{h} 14^{m} 05.304^{s}
- Declination: +19° 14′ 12.28″

Characteristics
- Evolutionary stage: white dwarf
- Spectral type: DA

Astrometry
Radial velocity (R_{v})	−47 km/s
Proper motion (μ)	RA: −0.610 mas/yr Dec.: −13.446 mas/yr
Parallax (π)	2.3396±0.2868 mas
Distance	approx. 1,400 ly (approx. 430 pc)

Details
Mass	0.56 ± 0.03 M_{☉}
Radius	0.015 R_{☉}
Surface gravity (log g)	7.85 ± 0.06 cgs
Temperature	27743 ± 310 K
Age	13.3 ± 0.5 Myr

Other designations
- SDSS J091405.30+191412.2, Gaia DR2 635879254021761024

Database references
SIMBAD	data

WD J0914+1914 is the first single white dwarf star found to have a giant planet orbiting it. Evidence of the giant planet was discovered by a team of astronomers from the UK, Chile and Germany.

The system was initially identified as a cataclysmic variable on the basis of weak H-alpha emissions in the spectrum by the Sloan Digital Sky Survey (SDSS). After closer inspection the team of astronomers discovered oxygen and sulfur lines in the SDSS spectra. The team then obtained spectroscopic follow-up observations with X-Shooter on ESO's Very Large Telescope. The spectra confirmed the previous observations by SDSS and found additional lines.

== Planet system ==
Dusty and gaseous debris disks around white dwarfs are known, but they are dominated by calcium lines and no previous disk around a white dwarf showed Hα emission. All previous disks around white dwarfs originate from rocky planetary bodies. The size of the disk around WD J0914+1914 was measured with the help of Doppler-broadbanded emission lines. The disk around the white dwarf is too large (~1–10 solar radii) to be formed by a small minor planet, which was tidally disrupted inside the Roche Radius. The team was also able to exclude accretion of material from a companion star or brown dwarf.

The WD J0914+1914 planetary system
Companion (in order from star)	Mass	Semimajor axis (AU)	Orbital period (days)	Eccentricity	Inclination (°)	Radius
b	~5.07 M_{🜨}	0.068	8.65 - 10.00	~0	—	~2.91 R_{🜨}

The most plausible explanation is an evaporating giant planet, orbiting close to the white dwarf. The atmosphere of the planet is evaporated by the strong ultraviolet radiation of the hot white dwarf. The planet is likely to be about 15 solar radii from the white dwarf and orbits it in 10 days. The composition of the accreted material shows similarity to certain deeper layers of the ice giants in the Solar System. The team estimated that the planet around WD J0914+1914 will, over the span of about 350 million years, lose about 0.04 Neptune masses, a negligible amount. Meanwhile, the dwarf will continue to cool.

== See also ==
- List of exoplanets and planetary debris around white dwarfs
- WD 1145+017
- ZTF J0139+5245
