= ZTF J0328−1219 =

White dwarf

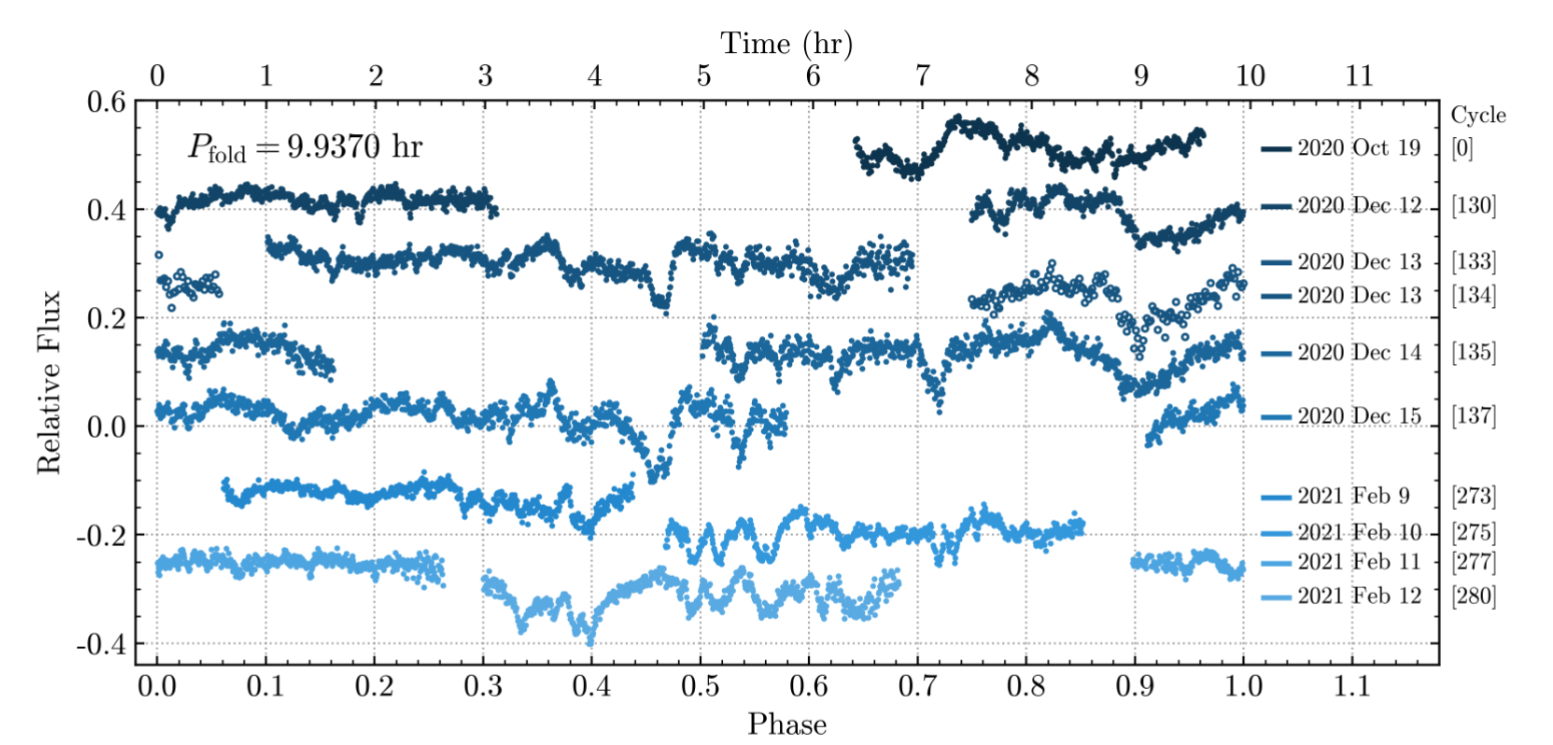
- ZTF J0328−1219 phase-fitted light curve with McDonald Observatory (solid circles) and SAAO (open circles); Credit: Vanderbosch et al. 2021

Observation data Epoch J2000 Equinox J2000
- Constellation: Eridanus
- Right ascension: 03^{h} 28^{m} 33.52^{s}
- Declination: −12° 19′ 45.3″
- Apparent magnitude (V): 17.28

Characteristics
- Evolutionary stage: white dwarf
- Spectral type: DZ
- Variable type: transiting debris

Astrometry
Radial velocity (R_{v})	58.8±0.8 km/s
Proper motion (μ)	RA: +110.739±0.055 mas/yr Dec.: −14.39±0.046 mas/yr
Parallax (π)	23.038±0.056 mas
Distance	141.6 ± 0.3 ly (43.4 ± 0.1 pc)

Details
Mass	0.731±0.023 M_{☉}
Radius	0.0107±0.0002 R_{☉}
Radius	7,444±139 km
Surface gravity (log g)	8.245±0.035 cgs
Temperature	7,630±140 K
Metallicity	[Ca/He] = −9.55±0.12
Age	cooling age: 1.84±0.17 Gyr

Other designations
- 2MASS J03283351−1219439, TIC 93031595, WISE J032833.56−121945.4, Gaia DR2 5161807767825277184

Database references
SIMBAD	data

ZTF J032833.52−121945.27 (also called ZTF J0328−1219) is a white dwarf with two transiting debris clouds around it.

ZTF J0328−1219 was first discovered as a white dwarf with Gaia and the virtual observatory in 2018. At the time it was known by its Gaia identification number. In 2021 it was discovered that this white dwarf has transiting debris around it. This was discovered with the Zwicky Transient Facility (ZTF) and follow-up photometry with the McDonald Observatory. It was also shown with spectroscopy from the Lowell Discovery Telescope (LDT) that the white dwarf has deep calcium absorption lines.

A more detailed study was published in 2021. Photometry was obtained with the TESS, ZTF, McDonald Observatory, SAAO, HAO, and JBO. Spectroscopy was obtained with SOAR, Magellan and the archived LDT spectrum. From the photometry the researchers find two significant periods at 9.937 and 11.2 hours (A-period and B-period). The dips change on nightly, weekly and monthly timescales. The researchers detected calcium, sodium, both with circumstellar origin. The sodium line is blueshifted by 21.4 ±1.0 km/s compared to the atmospheric lines. The researchers also identified atmospheric Hydrogen-alpha absorption. Due to the low amount of hydrogen, the researchers assume a helium dominated atmosphere. The variability of ZTF J0328−1219 is similar to WD 1145+017, but with notable differences. ZTF J0328−1219 is continuously variable, suggesting dust clouds orbit the white dwarf. These dust clouds either orbit the white dwarf on their own, or they are emitted by one or more bodies.

The two dust clouds would have semi-major axes of 2.11 and 2.28 R_{☉}. An orbiting exocomet is less likely because it would completely evaporate at this orbit within a few years. An orbiting exoasteroid on the other hand would not evaporate at this orbit. At the 9.93 hour orbit a body would be heated to a temperature of 700 Kelvin (K), but most minerals of asteroids evaporate at 1500-2500 K. The researchers propose several solutions for this problem:

1. Fine material ejected during collisions from bodies orbiting in a dust ring
2. Volatiles below the surface are heated and eject overlaying material (similar to some active asteroids in the Solar System)
3. An exocomet with deep pits that preserve volatiles for later times
4. An exocomet orbiting within a dusty disk, shielding the comet from radiation, lowering the temperature
5. An exoasteroid with an eccentric orbit that will peel off material during periastron passage
6. A cascade of collisions beginning with the collision of two bodies

Observations of ZTF J0328−1219 showed a long-term fading event. The white dwarf faded by around 0.3 mag between 2012 and 2014. This is interpreted as increased transit activity during this time. This discovery is based on observations with the Thai National Telescope.

== See also ==
- List of stars that have unusual dimming periods
- List of exoplanets and planetary debris around white dwarfs
