= GALEX J2339−0424 =

White dwarf in the constellation Aquarius

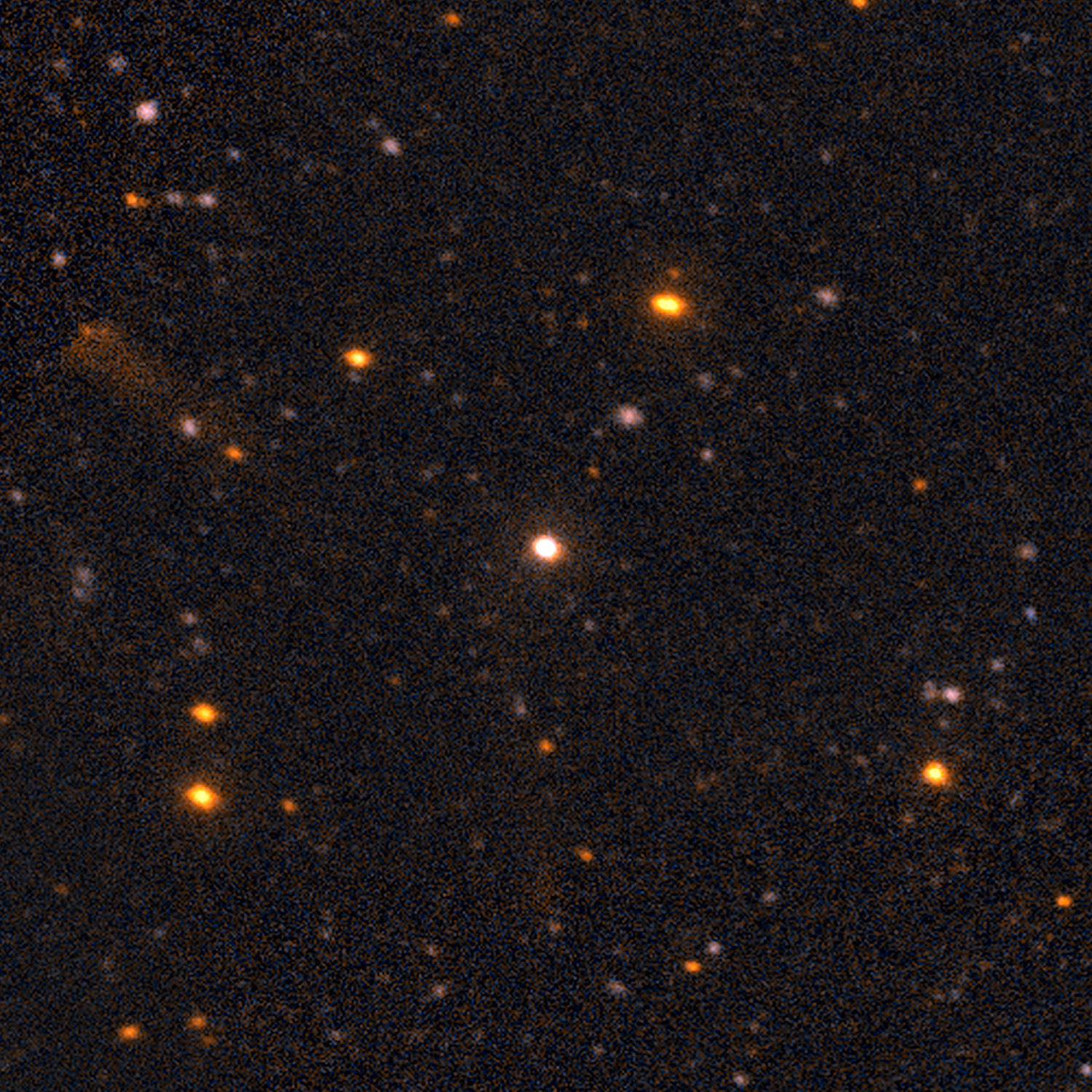
- GALEX J2339−0424 (star in the center) as seen by GALEX; Credit: NASA/JPL-Caltech GALEX

Observation data Epoch J2000 Equinox J2000
- Constellation: Aquarius
- Right ascension: 23^{h} 39^{m} 17.03^{s}
- Declination: −04° 24′ 24.7″

Characteristics
- Evolutionary stage: white dwarf
- Spectral type: DABZ
- Apparent magnitude (G): 16.16

Astrometry
Radial velocity (R_{v})	6±5 km/s
Proper motion (μ)	RA: +24.501±0.058 mas/yr Dec.: −32.293±0.048 mas/yr
Parallax (π)	11.2005±0.0581 mas
Distance	291 ± 2 ly (89.3 ± 0.5 pc)

Details
Mass	0.548±0.051 M_{☉}
Radius	0.0133±0.0008 R_{☉}
Surface gravity (log g)	7.93±0.09 cgs
Temperature	13,735±500 K
Age	cooling age: 241±6 Myr

Other designations
- 2MASS J23391701−0424248, GALEX J233917.0−042425, SDSS J233917.05−042425.0, TIC 136841996, USNO-A2.0 0825-19992233, Gaia DR2 2446993162322393088

Database references
SIMBAD	data

GALEX J2339−0424 (GALEX J233917.0−042425, GALEX J2339) is a white dwarf that is suspected to be polluted with material originating from an icy exomoon. This is evident from the first detection of beryllium in this white dwarf, together with GD 378.

GALEX J2339 was first identified as a possible quasar with GALEX in 2007. It was identified as a white dwarf candidate from Gaia and virtual observatory data in 2018. In 2020 it was identified as a DBAZ: white dwarf, which means that it had helium, hydrogen and metal absorption lines. In 2021 the white dwarf was observed with Lick, Magellan 1 and Keck. The observations showed that the object had absorption due to hydrogen, helium, beryllium, oxygen, magnesium, silicon, calcium, titanium, chromium, manganese and iron. The oxygen is present in excess, which indicates a water ice-rich body. The accreted parent object had a chondrite-like composition and was 85% water ice in volume. The accretion event lasted for 2–4 Million years and the parent body had a mass of 3×10^{20}–1×10^{21} kg, or between about the mass of Vesta to about the mass of Ceres.

Exomoons as a source of white dwarf pollution has been proposed since 2016/2017 and their fate around white dwarfs was further studied later, showing that around 1% of polluted white dwarfs should be polluted with exomoons. The presence of beryllium is thought to be the result of spallation of heavier elements (especially oxygen) on the surface of an icy dust belt around a giant planet. The icy dust belts enriched in beryllium will then form exomoons, which might pollute white dwarf. These icy dust belts are comparable to Saturns rings and rings around J1407b. Other scenarios are mentioned, such as the radiation of a Wolf-Rayet star. But these environments are less favourable to produce the observed beryllium excess. The spallation should also produce lithium and boron, but (as of September 2024) these are not detected around GALEX J2339 or GD 378.

== See also ==
- List of exoplanets and planetary debris around white dwarfs
- List of exomoon candidates
