= WD 0816−310 =

White dwarf in the constellation Puppis

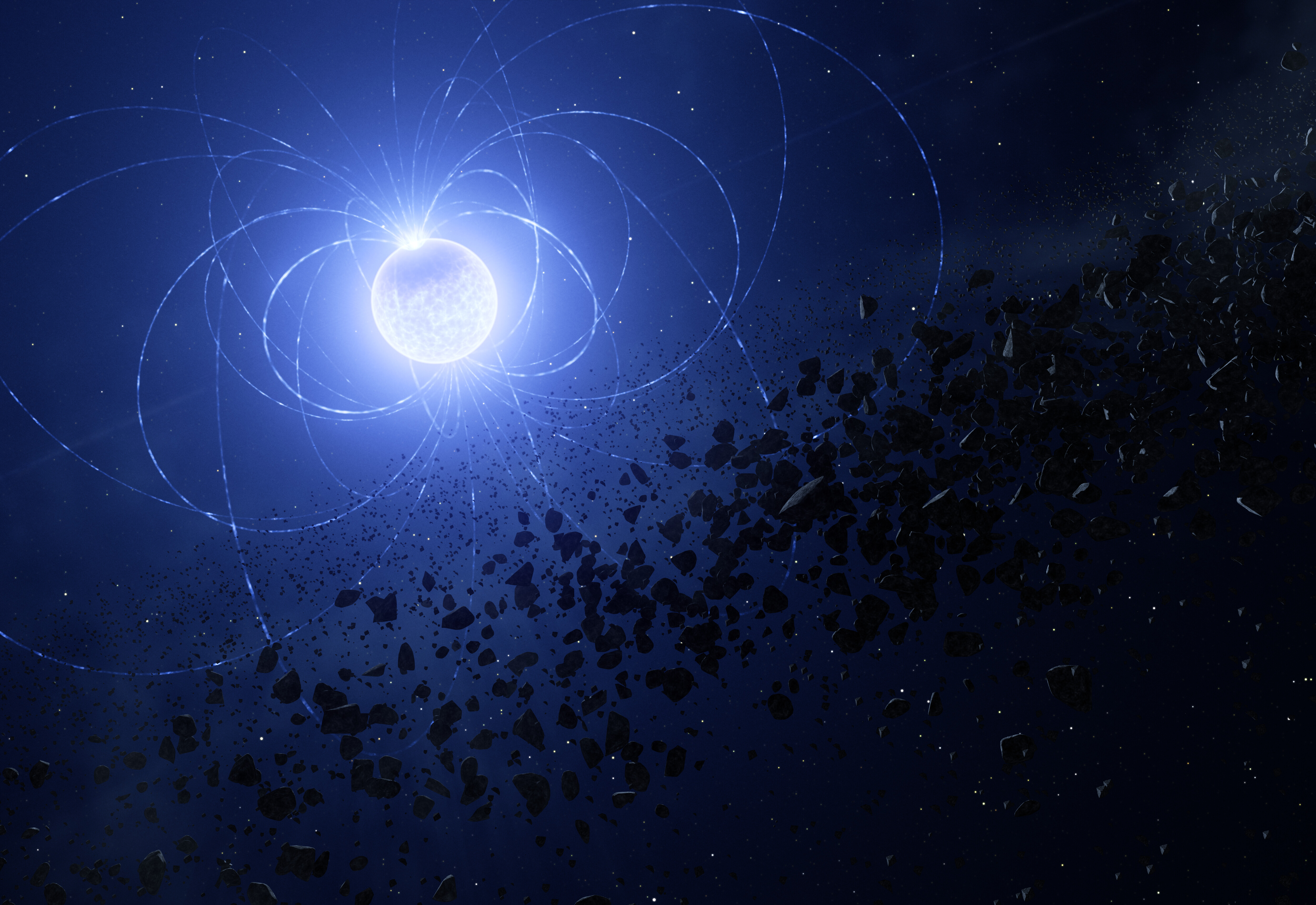
- Artist's impression of WD 0816−310, its disk, its magnetic field and the metal scars near one of the magnetic poles Credit: ESO/L. Calçada

Observation data Epoch J2000 Equinox J2000
- Constellation: Puppis
- Right ascension: 08^{h} 18^{m} 40.261^{s}
- Declination: −31° 10′ 20.33″
- Apparent magnitude (V): 15.43

Characteristics
- Evolutionary stage: white dwarf
- Spectral type: DBAZ
- Apparent magnitude (G): 15.39
- Variable type: magnetic and spectroscopic variable

Astrometry
Proper motion (μ)	RA: +237.736±0.020 mas/yr Dec.: −786.034±0.024 mas/yr
Parallax (π)	51.6508±0.0240 mas
Distance	63.15 ± 0.03 ly (19.361 ± 0.009 pc)

Details
Mass	0.72 M_{☉}
Radius	0.0105 (Note: Derived from known mass and surface gravity of white dwarf.) R_{☉}
Surface gravity (log g)	8.25 cgs
Temperature	6250 K
Rotation	10.89426 days
Age	cooling age: 4.2 Gyr total age: 4.8 Gyr

Other designations
- CNS5 2061, SCR J0818−3110, 2MASS J08184024−3110196, PM J08186−3110, TIC 147018085, Gaia DR2 5548080118369905408

Database references
SIMBAD	data

WD 0816−310 (PM J08186−3110) is a magnetic white dwarf with metal pollution, originating from the tidal disruption of a planetary body. The metals are guided by the magnetic field onto the surface of the white dwarf, creating a "scar" on the surface of the white dwarf. This scar is rich in the accreted planetary material.

The object was first identified as a possible white dwarf in 2005, from data of the Digitized Sky Survey. It was confirmed as a white dwarf in 2008 with spectroscopic data from CTIO and the same team found that the white dwarf is polluted with calcium, magnesium and iron. In 2019 a variable magnetic field was discovered thanks to Zeeman splitting. This observation was made with archived spectropolarimetric data from FORS1 at the Very Large Telescope (VLT). In 2021 the white dwarf was studied in detail with the 4 m telescope at CTIO, and with the VLT (FORS1 and X-shooter). The elements sodium, magnesium, calcium, chromium, manganese, iron and nickel were detected in the atmosphere of the white dwarf. The atmosphere is enriched in magnesium, relative to other elements, which is predicted for old stellar systems. The researchers also found hydrogen in this otherwise helium-dominated atmosphere of WD 0816−310. The presence of hydrogen could be explained with the pollution of an asteroid containing water ice. These researchers found that the abundance of metals changed between two spectra 10 years apart. They suggested that spots enriched in metals are present on the surface of the white dwarfs, a process controlled by the magnetic field of the white dwarfs. In 2024 this was confirmed with circular spectropolarimetric observations with FORS2 on the VLT. The observations measured a dipolar field strength at the pole of about 140 Kilogauss. Around 310,000 years ago WD 0816−310 accreted a Vesta-sized object with a composition similar to chondritic meteorites.

The observations showed that the variation metal line strength and magnetic field intensity are synchronized. This is seen as evidence that the magnetic field determines the local density of metals on the surface. These patches are likely present near one of the magnetic poles of the white dwarf. The material from an accreted asteroid will first form a disk around the white dwarf. Closer to the white dwarf the dusty material will sublimate into a metal-gas. The researchers claim that white dwarf will ionize at least a part of the gas. These ions will follow the magnetic field of the white dwarf and as a result of the Lorentz force it will follow a spiral orbit around the local field line. On their way to the poles of the white dwarf, the ions will collide with neutral atoms in the gas disk, ionizing them in the process. This leads to a substantial level of ionization of the gas disk.

A study in 2024 that discovered the second metal scar around WD 2138−332, suggests that metal scars are common around magnetic white dwarfs with metal pollution.

== See also ==
- List of exoplanets and planetary debris around white dwarfs
