= WD 1647+375 =

White dwarf star in the constellation Hercules

- Artist's impression of white dwarf WD 1647+375

Observation data Epoch J2000 Equinox J2000
- Constellation: Hercules
- Right ascension: 16^{h} 49^{m} 20.2995^{s}
- Declination: +37° 28′ 21.248″
- Apparent magnitude (V): 14.98

Characteristics
- Evolutionary stage: white dwarf
- Spectral type: DA2.2

Astrometry
Proper motion (μ)	RA: −60.130 mas/yr Dec.: +11.234 mas/yr
Parallax (π)	12.7364±0.0296 mas
Distance	256.1 ± 0.6 ly (78.5 ± 0.2 pc)

Details
Mass	0.57±0.01 M_{☉}
Radius	0.0144±0.0003 R_{☉}
Surface gravity (log g)	7.88±0.03 cgs
Temperature	22,040±31 K
Age	30±2 Myr

Other designations
- WD J164920.30+372821.25, PG 1647+376, SDSS J164920.29+372821.2, Gaia DR2 1351486711809893888

Database references
SIMBAD	data

WD 1647+375 (WD J164920.30+372821.25, PG 1647+376) is a DA2.2 type white dwarf located approximately 256 light-years from Earth in the constellation Hercules.

This star has a mass of 0.57 M☉ and a radius of 0.0144 R☉. As it is a white dwarf – the remnant of a stellar core, its temperature will be high, specifically 22040 K. The log(g) gravity on the surface of this object is 7.88 cgs, and its age is 30 million years.

== Icy Exoplanetesimal ==
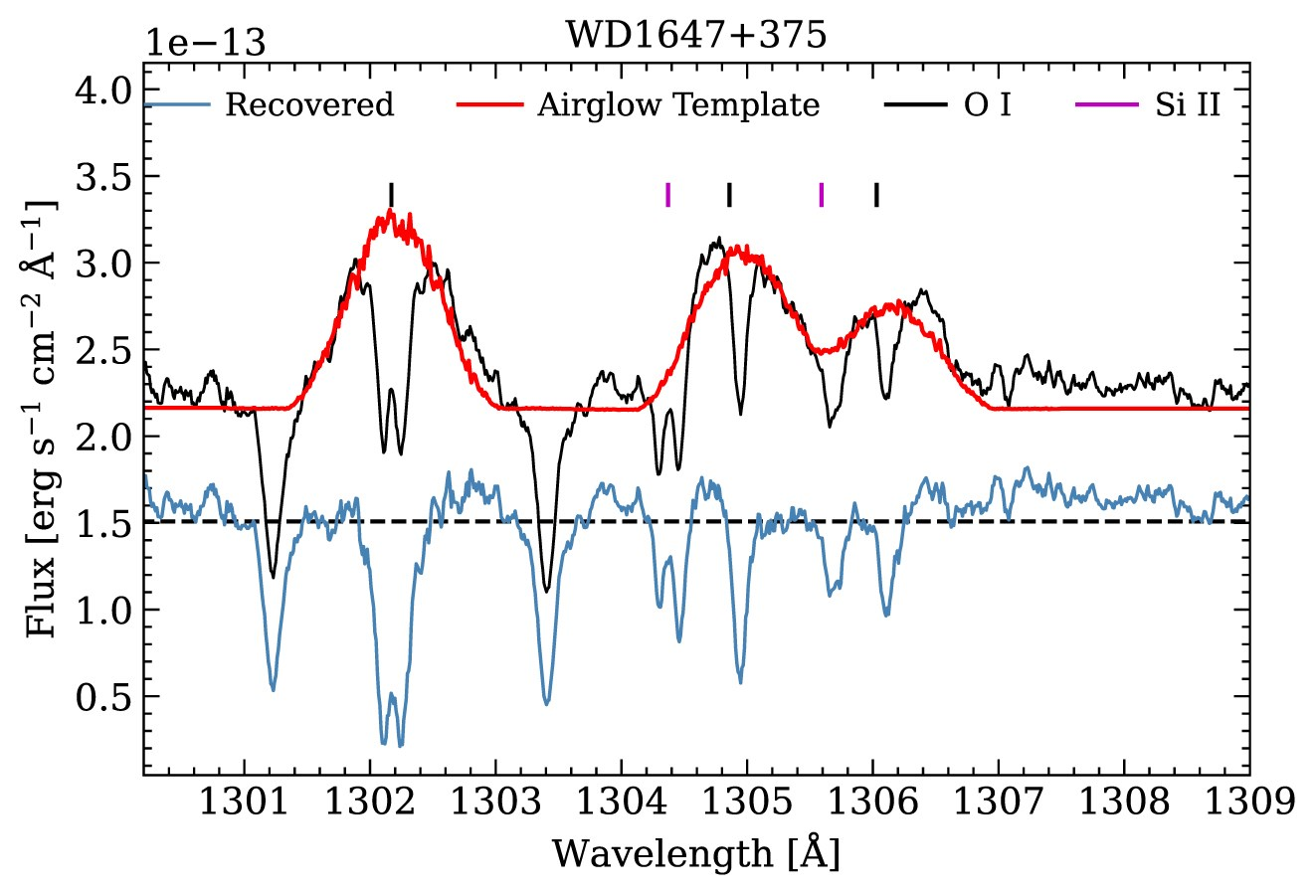
Airglow correction of WD 1647+375 of the deep exposure where the raw spectrum and the best-fitting airglow template are shown in black and red, respectively

In September 2025, a group of astronomers, led by researchers from the University of Warwick (UK), utilized data from the Hubble Space Telescope, STIS and the ground-based VLT telescope. Analysis of the ultraviolet spectrum revealed interesting details.

The white dwarf WD 1647+375 was quite different from others of its kind. It stood out due to the presence of volatile substances on its surface. The atmosphere of white dwarfs typically consists of hydrogen and helium, but in this case, elements such as carbon, nitrogen, sulfur, and oxygen were detected.

Furthermore, ultraviolet spectroscopy, used in the study, revealed a high percentage of nitrogen in the material accreted by the star, specifically ~5%. Additionally, the atmosphere of WD 1647+375 also contains significantly more oxygen, approximately 84% more, than would be expected. All of this indicated the presence of an icy object in the system, designated as WD 1647+375 b.

Astronomers had data indicating that the debris had been feeding the star for at least the past 13 years at a rate of 200,000 kg per second. This meant the icy object had a diameter of 3 to 50 km and could have weighed a quintillion kilograms.

In total, these data provided insight into an icy/water-rich planetesimal (composed of 64% water) being consumed by its parent star, possibly a comet similar to Halley's Comet, or a fragment of a dwarf planet, like C/2016 R2.

This object can be compared to Kuiper Belt Objects (KBOs) in our Solar System. This planetesimal is most likely a fragment of a dwarf planet, such as Pluto.

The WD 1647+375 planetary system
Companion (in order from star)	Mass	Semimajor axis (AU)	Orbital period (days)	Eccentricity	Inclination (°)	Radius
b	4.5×10^{−07} M_{🜨}	—	—	—	—	0.012±0.04 R_{🜨}
