= QZ Serpentis =

Dwarf nova in the constellation Serpens

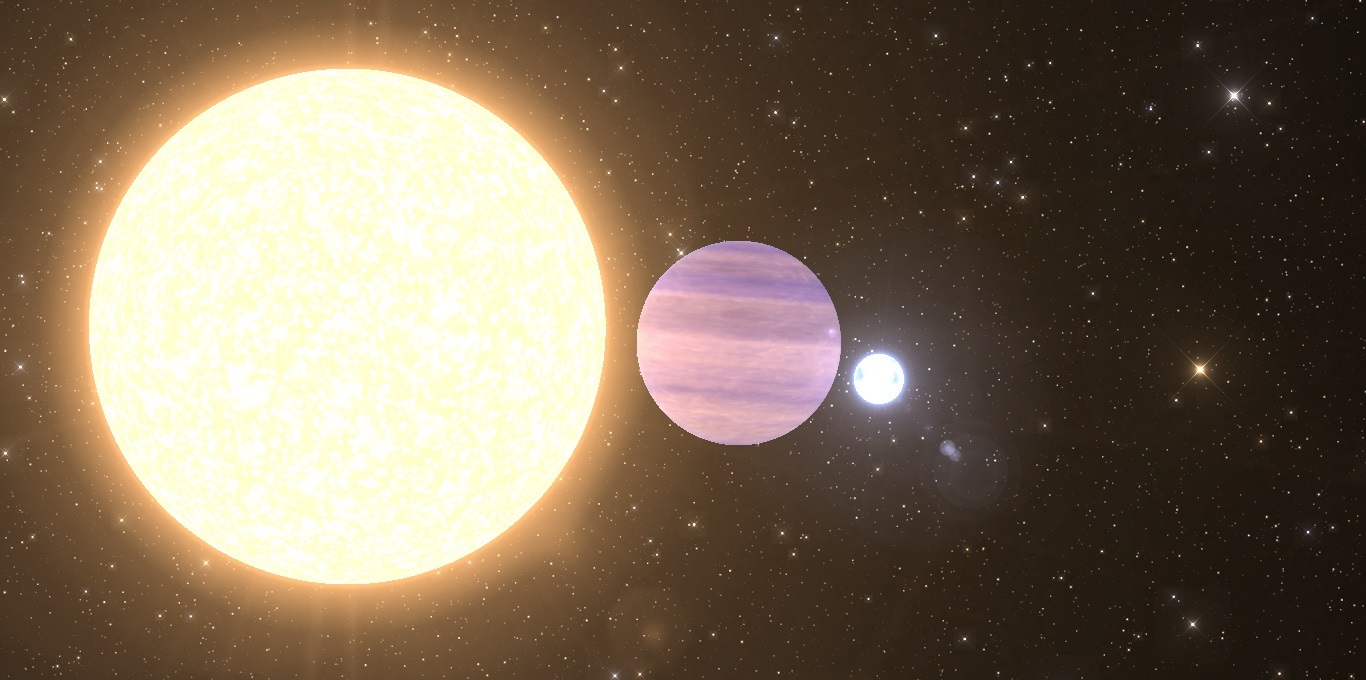
- Artistic Representation of QZ Serpentis system

Observation data Epoch J2000.0 Equinox ICRS
- Constellation: Serpens
- Right ascension: 15^{h} 56^{m} 54.4738^{s}
- Declination: +21° 07′ 19.083″
- Apparent magnitude (V): 11.8 - 17.7

Characteristics
- Spectral type: DA + K4Ve
- U−B color index: −0.32
- B−V color index: +0.72
- Variable type: U Gem

Astrometry
| Radial velocity (R_{v}) | −48.0±6.0 km/s |
| Proper motion (μ) | RA: +5.215 mas/yr Dec.: −9.865 mas/yr |
| Parallax (π) | 3.1106±0.0742 mas |
| Distance | 1,050 ± 30 ly (321 ± 8 pc) |

Orbit
| Primary | QZ Ser A |
| Name | QZ Ser B |
| Period (P) | 119.752 min |
| Semi-major axis (a) | 0.974 R_{☉} |
| Eccentricity (e) | 0 (fixed) |
| Inclination (i) | 32° |
| Semi-amplitude (K_{2}) (secondary) | 207.5 km/s |

Details

A
| Mass | 0.75 M_{☉} |
| Radius | 0.0107 R_{☉} |

B
| Mass | 0.15 M_{☉} |
| Radius | 0.1923 R_{☉} |

Other designations
- QZ Ser, TIC 229556065, 2MASS J15565447+2107190, Gaia DR3 1204588041329337600

Database references
| SIMBAD | data |

QZ Serpentis (abbreviated QZ Ser) is a binary star system consisting of an orange dwarf and a white dwarf, located approximately 1050 light-years away from us in the constellation Serpens. It is considered a dwarf nova because the white dwarf draws the outer layers of hydrogen from the star. The two stars orbit each other once every 119.752 minutes or 2 hours, and they may also be accompanied by a third substellar companion, whose mass is only about half that of Jupiter. QZ Ser was discovered by Katsumi Haseda in 1998.

== Planetary system ==
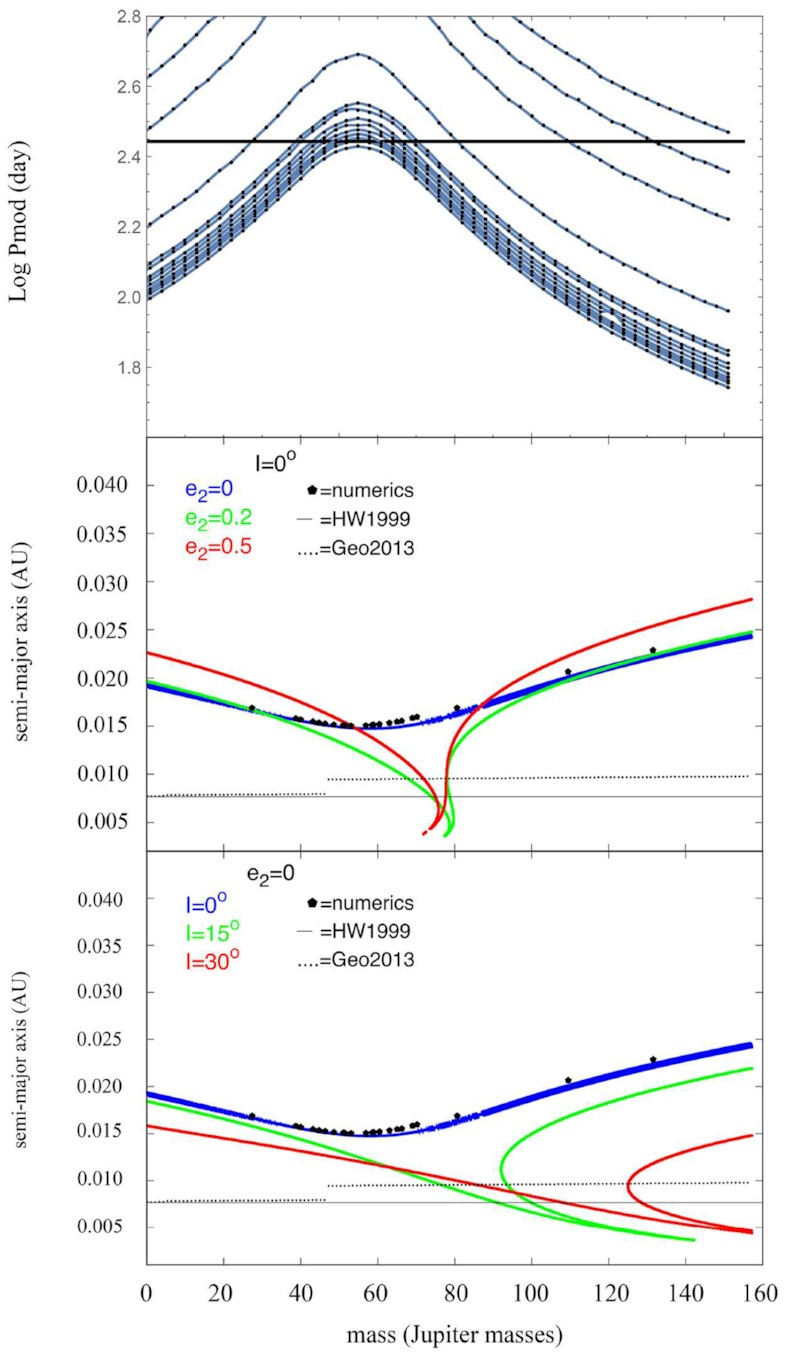
Numerical integrations for the QZ Ser system.

In 2022, Carlos E. Chavez et al. decided to test the third-body hypothesis in cataclysmic variables using very long photometric periods, and based their study on four systems. During their research, they found additional evidence supporting this hypothesis in three systems, including QZ Serpentis. The candidate planet is in a circular orbit with a mass of 0.63 M_{J} and a semi-major axis of 0.019 AU. The mass and semi-major estimates assume that the planetary orbit is in the plane of the binary star orbit.

The QZ Serpentis planetary system
| Companion (in order from star) | Mass | Semimajor axis (AU) | Orbital period (days) | Eccentricity | Inclination (°) | Radius |
|---|---|---|---|---|---|---|
| b | 0.63 M_{J} | 0.019 | 1.04 | 0 | ≈32 | — |
