= HS 0209+0832 =

White dwarf in the constellation Cetus

- Artist's impression of HS 0209+0832 and its planet

Observation data Epoch J2000.0 Equinox ICRS
- Constellation: Cetus
- Right ascension: 02^{h} 12^{m} 04.854^{s}
- Declination: +08° 46′ 50.89″
- Apparent magnitude (V): 13.84

Characteristics
- Spectral type: DA1.4
- Apparent magnitude (J): 14.785±0.041
- Apparent magnitude (H): 14.991±0.071
- Apparent magnitude (K): 15.241±0.172

Astrometry
Proper motion (μ)	RA: +80.074(57) mas/yr Dec.: −25.774(43) mas/yr
Parallax (π)	12.0996±0.0560 mas
Distance	270 ± 1 ly (82.6 ± 0.4 pc)

Details
Mass	0.61±0.01 M_{☉}
Radius	0.0145±0.0002 R_{☉}
Temperature	35,000 K
Age	5 Myr

Other designations
- Feige 20, WD 0209+085, 2MASS J02120485+0846508, Gaia DR3 2521867808229983744

Database references
SIMBAD	data

HS 0209+0832 is a young white dwarf in the constellation Cetus. It has a helium-enriched atmosphere enriched in heavy elements such as niobium, nickel, and calcium. In 2026, it was announced a candidate second generation planet orbiting the star.

== Characteristics ==
HS 0209+0832 is a white dwarf with the spectral class DA1.4. It has a mass of 0.61 M_{☉} and a radius of 10,100 km. It has an effective temperature of 35,000 K and a cooling age of about 5 million years. Its atmosphere is primarily hydrogen, with about 1% helium.

== Planetary system ==
In 1999, Hubble Space Telescope observations in the far-ultraviolet detected the presence of carbon, aluminium, silicon, and other heavy elements in HS 0209+0832's atmosphere. The presence of these elements, alongside the helium-enriched atmosphere, suggested ongoing accretion, but no source was identified. In the 25 years since, several other similarly polluted white dwarfs were discovered to be planetary debris.

In a paper published on 5 October 2026, the detection of a second-generation exoplanet was announced in the journal Nature. NASA announced that the Hubble Space Telescope had been used to view HS 0209+0832 and had seen the unusual abundance of certain elements in the atmosphere; niobium, nickel, and calcium had been seen absorbing light, indicated by dips in the wavelengths of light.

HS 0209+0832 is the core of a star that burned through all of its nuclear fuel and its outer envelope of gas and dust were disassembled by outer space. This planet is a second generation planet that formed from the cast-off gas and dust. The planet is strongly irradiated by its host star, leading to atmospheric loss to space.

The ultraviolet spectrum of HS 0209+0832 showing the presence of contaminating elements
