= Second generation planet =

Type of planet

Artist's concept of the candidate planet orbiting HS 0209+0832

A second generation planet is a type of exoplanet that forms in a binary star system when one of the stars becomes a red giant and mass transfers from it to an accretion disk around the other star where the planet can form. This accretion disk is referred to by the name second-generation disk as it is the second accretion disk to form around the star. The material within the second-generation disk contains more metal and dust than first proto stellar disks that normally form around stars due to the material ejected from the stellar winds of the older stars. This results in the second-generation planets containing higher levels of metal and dust. The second-generation planets take approximately one million years to form from the disk of material. It is also possible for a third-generation disk to form even later in the binary system’s life.

Alternatively a second generation planet can form as a pulsar planet or form around a single white dwarf such as HS 0209+0832.
