= KPD 0005+5106 =

Helium-burning pre-white dwarf in the constellation Cassiopeia

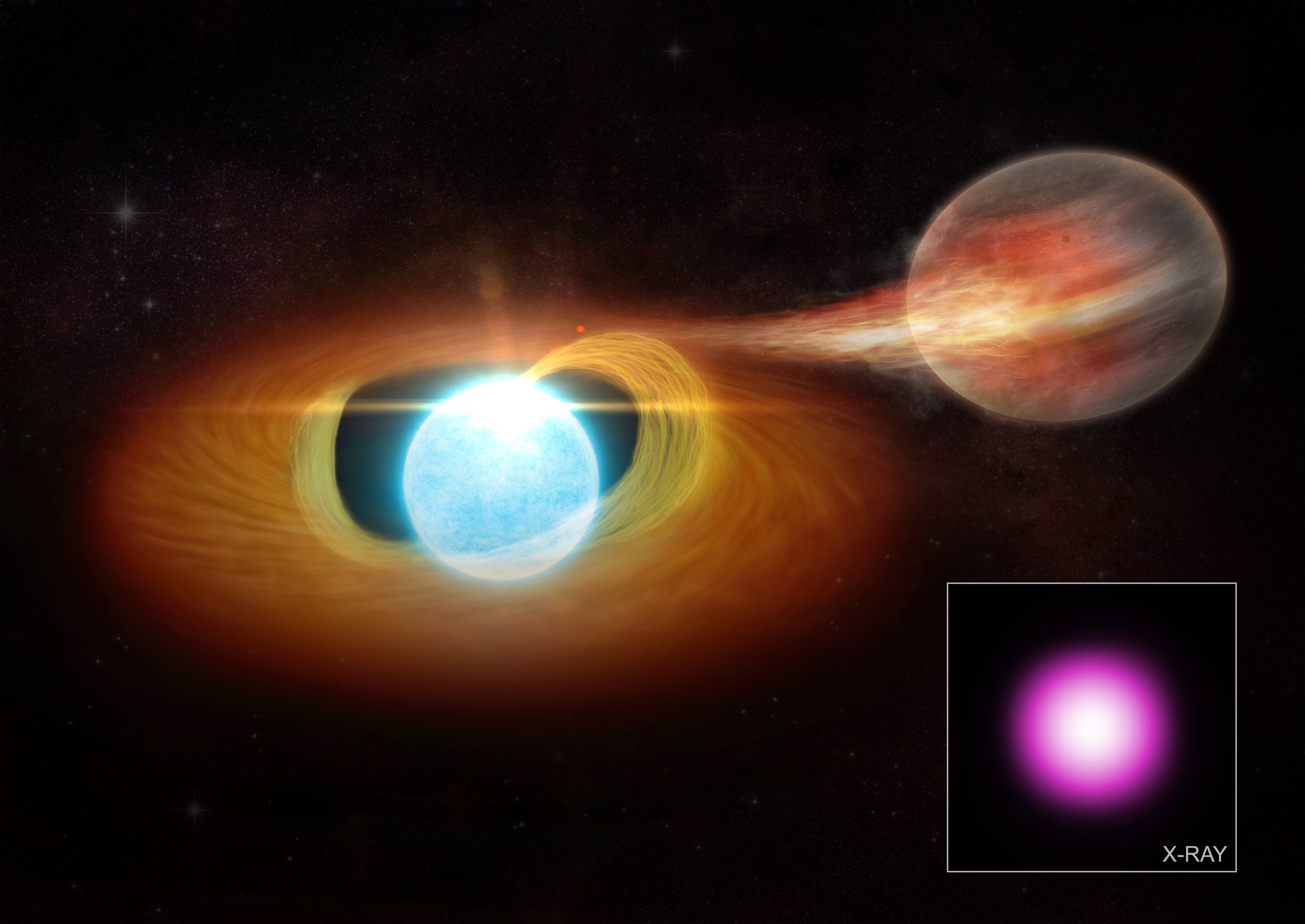
- Artist impression of KPD 0005+5106 and possible companion object

Observation data Epoch J2000 Equinox J2000
- Constellation: Cassiopeia
- Right ascension: 00^{h} 08^{m} 18.17031^{s}
- Declination: +51° 23′ 16.5984″
- Apparent magnitude (V): 13.32

Characteristics
- Evolutionary stage: Helium-burning pre-white dwarf
- Spectral type: DOZ1

Astrometry
Proper motion (μ)	RA: +30.043 mas/yr Dec.: −0.727 mas/yr
Parallax (π)	2.4089±0.0355 mas
Distance	1,350 ± 20 ly (415 ± 6 pc)

Details
Mass	0.64+0.08 −0.04 M_{☉}
Radius	0.059+0.031 −0.018 R_{☉}
Luminosity	5,000 L_{☉}
Surface gravity (log g)	6.7±0.3 cgs
Temperature	200,000±20,000 K

Database references
SIMBAD	data

KPD 0005+5106 is a helium-rich white dwarf located 1,350 light-years from Earth. As a "pre-white dwarf", it is believed to still be in the helium-burning phase, just before nuclear fusion finally stops. It is one of the hottest known white dwarfs, with a temperature of 200,000 K.

== Possible companion object ==
KPD 0005+5106 has been observed to emit high-energy X-rays that regularly increase and descrease in luminosity every 4 hours and 42 minutes. This indicates that the star possibly has a companion orbiting it. Simulations show that a Jupiter-mass object can exceed the roche lobe and is the most likely companion for KPD 0005+5106. The white dwarf pulls material from its companion into a disk around itself, before it slams into its north and south poles. The concentration of material at the poles causes the creation of two bright spots emitting high-energy X-rays.
