= ZTF J0139+5245 =

White dwarf

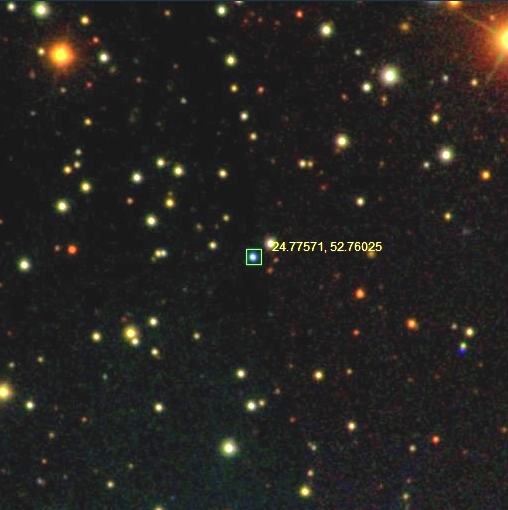
- Context star field of ZTF J013906.17+524536.89

Observation data Epoch J2000.0 Equinox ICRS
- Constellation: Perseus
- Right ascension: 01^{h} 39^{m} 06.17^{s} (24.77571)
- Declination: +52° 45′ 36.9″ (52.76025)
- Apparent magnitude (V): 18.4

Characteristics
- Spectral type: DA

Astrometry
| Distance | 564 ly (172.9 ± 7.4 pc) |

Details
| Mass | 0.52 ± 0.03 M_{☉} |
| Radius | 0.0136 ± 0.00563 (Note: Derived from known mass and surface gravity of the star.) R_{☉} |
| Luminosity | 0.0022 (Note: Derived from known temperature and derived radius.) L_{☉} |
| Surface gravity (log g) | 7.86 ± 0.06 cgs |
| Temperature | 10,530 ± 140 K |

Other designations
- J0139; ZTF J013906.17+524536.89

Database references
| SIMBAD | data |

ZTF J0139+5245 (also known as J0139 and ZTF J013906.17+524536.89) is a white dwarf star approximately 564 light-years (172.9 pc) from Earth in the constellation of Perseus. It is the second white dwarf, after WD 1145+017, to be observed with transits indicative of orbiting planetary material. The star has been found to display deep, irregularly shaped transits suggestive of disrupted planetary debris. Two transits have been observed in the 210-day-long Zwicky Transient Facility (ZTF) light curve of the star, each transit about 25 days long and producing 30−45% dips in brightness. The two transits are about 110 days apart, substantially longer than the short 4.5 hour orbital period seen with WD1145+017. Based on the two observed transits from the Zwicky Transient Facility, the next observable transit was calculated to occur around 15 October 2019. Follow up observations of the star using the Las Cumbres Observatory (LCO) global telescope network showed a third full transit and an additional partial transit.

== Stellar characteristics ==
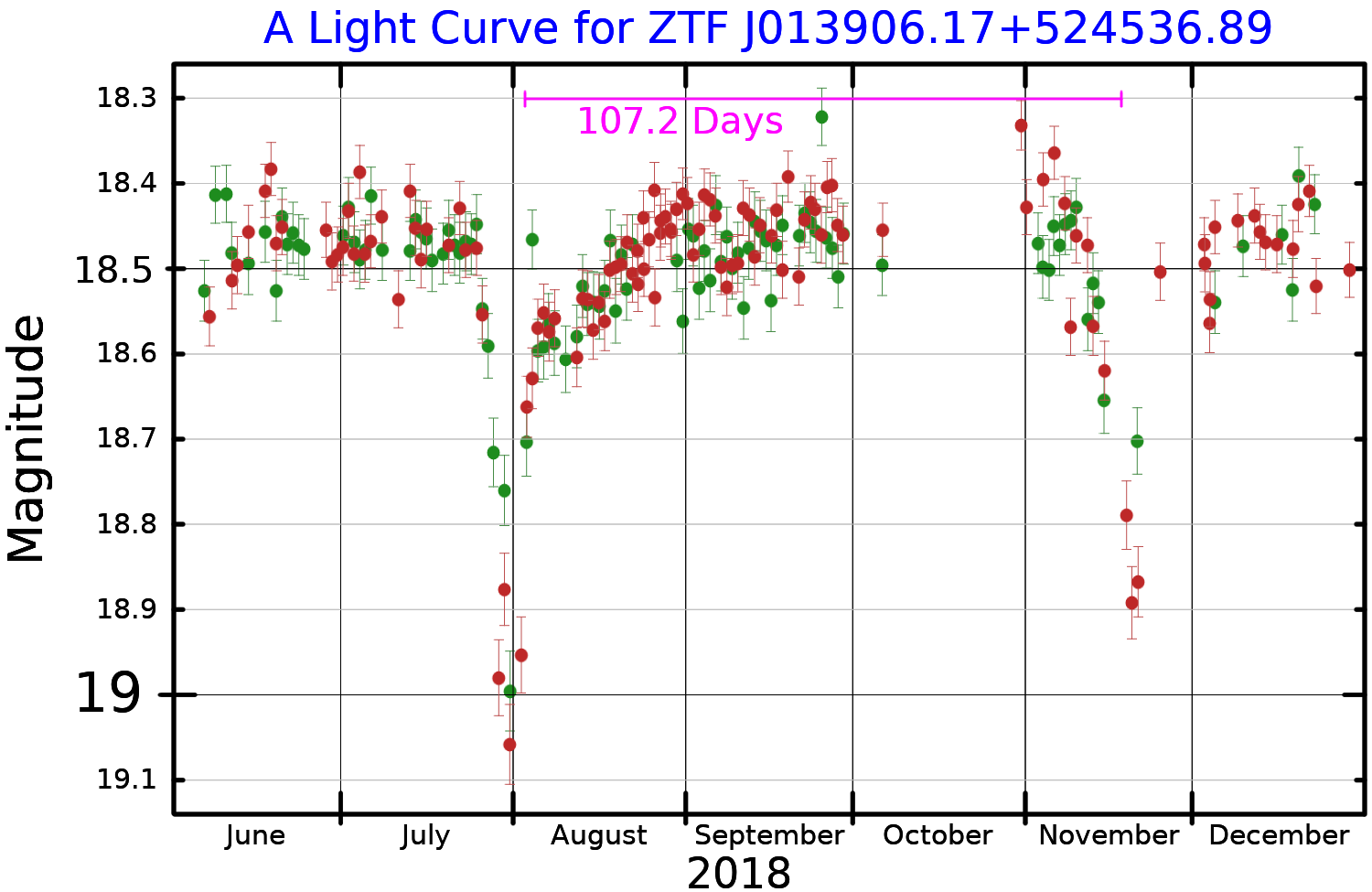
A light curve for ZTF J0139+5245, showing the ZTF red and green band data during the period of the first two observed transit events. Adapted from Vanderbosch et al. The 107.2 day orbital period is shown in purple.

The white dwarf has a mass of 0.54 M_{☉}, a temperature of 10,530 ± 140 K and a log (g) of 7.86 ± 0.06.

The apparent magnitude of the star, or how bright it appears from Earth's perspective, is about 18.4. Therefore, it is too dim to be seen with the naked eye.

The star has been found to display deep, irregularly shaped transits suggestive of disrupted planetary debris.

== Planetary system ==
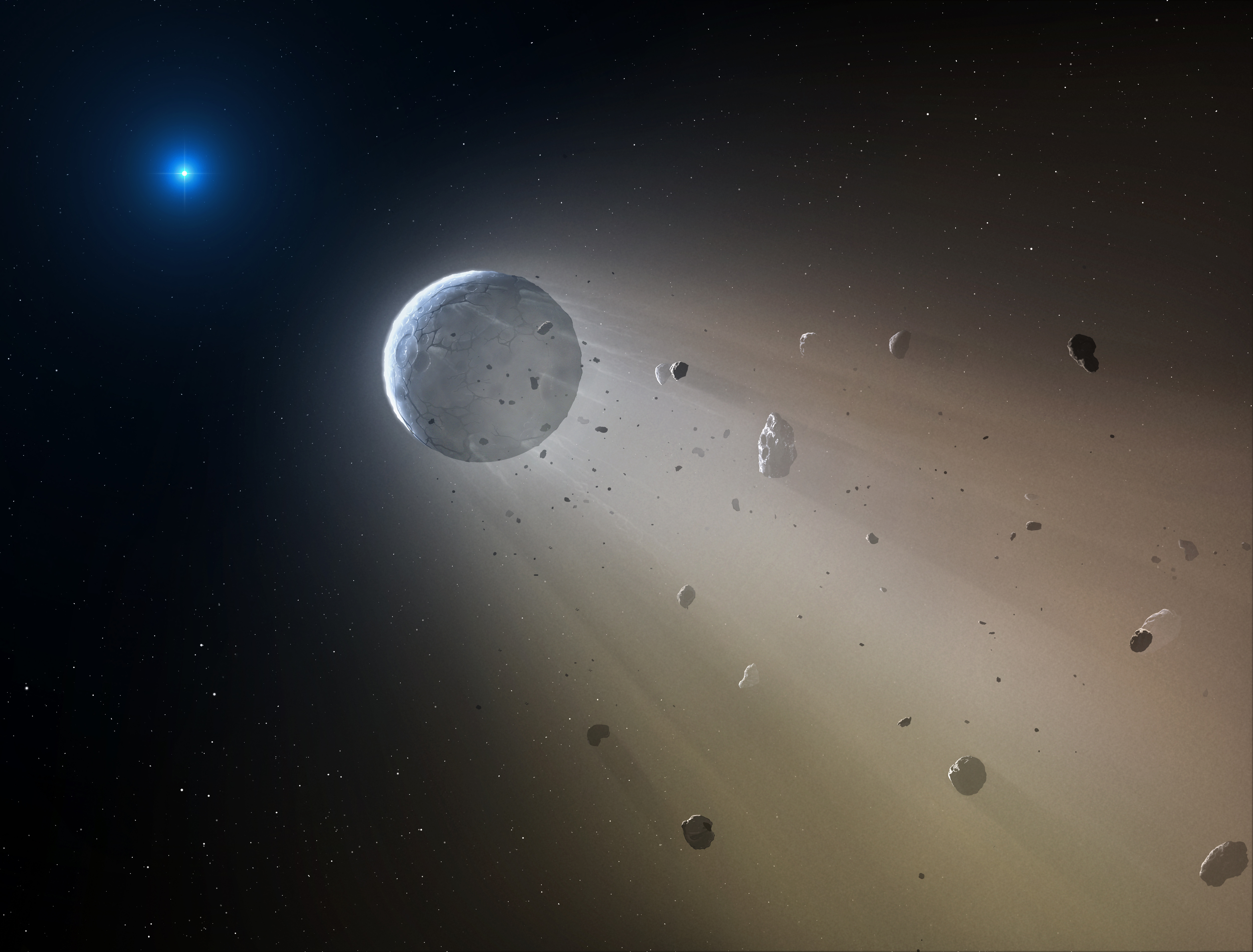
Planetary object being vaporized by its parent star (artist's concept)

The ZTF J0139+5245 planetary system
| Companion (in order from star) | Mass | Semimajor axis (AU) | Orbital period (days) | Eccentricity | Inclination (°) | Radius |
|---|---|---|---|---|---|---|
| b | — | 0.355 | 107.2 | > 0.97 | — | — |

The supposed planetesimal, ZTF J0139+5245 b, is presumably being ripped apart by the star.

== See also ==
- Disrupted planet
- List of stars that have unusual dimming periods
- List of exoplanets and planetary debris around white dwarfs
- WD 1145+017
- WD J0914+1914
- ZTF J0328-1219
