= GD 356 =

Star in the constellation Draco

Observation data Epoch J2000.0 Equinox ICRS
- Constellation: Draco
- Right ascension: 16^{h} 40^{m} 57.16^{s}
- Declination: +53° 41′ 09.6″
- Apparent magnitude (V): 15.06

Characteristics
- Evolutionary stage: white dwarf
- Spectral type: DAHe
- Apparent magnitude (B): ~15.39
- Apparent magnitude (R): ~15.1
- Apparent magnitude (I): ~14.0
- Apparent magnitude (J): ~14.493
- Apparent magnitude (H): ~14.479
- Apparent magnitude (K): ~14.369
- U−B color index: −0.52
- B−V color index: +0.33
- Variable type: 0.2% over 115 minutes

Astrometry
Radial velocity (R_{v})	25 km/s
Proper motion (μ)	RA: −119.425±0.031 mas/yr Dec.: −190.438±0.031 mas/yr
Parallax (π)	49.6501±0.0207 mas
Distance	65.69 ± 0.03 ly (20.141 ± 0.008 pc)
Absolute magnitude (M_{V})	13.43

Details
Mass	0.67 M_{☉}
Surface gravity (log g)	8 cgs
Temperature	7510 K
Rotation	115 minutes
Age	About 2.1 Gyr

Other designations
- Gliese 1205, LP 137-43, EGGR 329, WD 1639+537

Database references
SIMBAD	data
ARICNS	data

GD 356 is a white dwarf in the constellation of Draco showing an unusual emission of circular polarised light. The star is 65 light years from earth.

Other catalog names for this are LP 137-43, EGGR 329 and WD 1639+537.

== Spectral peculiarities ==
The class of this white dwarf is DA_{e} meaning that it has a cool helium rich atmosphere. This star exhibits emission lines showing the Zeeman effect in the hydrogen Balmer spectrum. GD 356 belongs to a class of high field magnetic white dwarfs (HFMWD), but it is unique in that the split lines are purely emission lines with no absorption. The emission region appears to be due to a heated upper layer in the photosphere in which the magnetic field is uniform to within 10%. The emission can be produced by an atmosphere at 7500K in a gravity field of 10^{6} ms^{−2} and a magnetic field of 13 megaGauss. The magnetically split emission lines, H_{α} and H_{β}, are circularly polarised. One explanation is that it is caused by a large electric current flowing between the poles of the star and a highly conducting planet. This planet was not detected in a later, more detailed analysis with new data. Rejecting the idea of an orbiting planet. Other explanations such as being due to Bondi-Hoyle accretion or due to a corona are ruled out by the lack of radio and X-ray emissions. Accretion of gas at a low rate over a broad area of the star, only results in heating at levels high in the atmosphere and not down to the opacity depth of 1.0 as observed with these lines.

The spectrum does not vary over periods of hours or days. This indicates that the rotation axis must match the magnetic dipole axis. The power radiated by the emission lines is 10^{27} erg s^{−1}. Overall light from the white dwarf varies by 0.2% smoothly over a period of 117 minutes. Explanations given for the variation are a dark spot rotating with the star. This could be near the rotation pole when viewed nearly edge on, or could be on the equator with the pole pointing roughly towards Earth.

== Properties ==
The mass of GD 356 is 0.67 M_{☉} whereas when it was a main sequence star it would have had a mass of 3.25 M_{☉}. In order to reach a temperature of 7510 K it would have become a white dwarf about 1.6 Gya. Prior to this the main sequence lifetime would have been 500 million years giving it a total age of 2.1 billion years. The current magnitude is 15.

The absolute visual magnitude is +13.43±0.16. Proper motion is 0.24" pa, in direction 212°. The trigonometric parallax is 21.1 parsecs. Tangential motion is 25 km^{−1}.

== Spectrum ==
The H_{α} line splitting is 44.5 nm. In similar white dwarfs an absorption line is expected to be seen instead, so that means the emission has sufficient energy to overpower any absorption. The emission was originally discovered by Jesse L. Greenstein. The original H_{α} line has a wavelength at 655.2 nm and is called the π component. The blue shifted component σ^{−} has wavelength 633.4 nm and red shifted component line σ^{+} is at 678.2 nm.

== Rejected companion ==
The unipolar-inductor theory says that a high-conduction companion orbits. As it moves through the star's magnetic field, a high voltage is produced between the star facing side of the planet and the dark side. A current then flows along field lines to the point on the star where the field lines meet the star's photosphere, the current is completed through the photosphere heating it up.

A planet in a close orbit would develop the shape of the Roche potential and is very likely to be molten due to tidal heating. A planet with a density of over five g/cm^{3} is stable at an orbital period longer than 4.7 hours. A planet in this kind of orbit may have a temperature of 560 K and could be detectable in infrared if it was large enough.

Infrared observations rule out a large companion such as a brown dwarf or other large planet over twelve Jupiter masses. This is based on the expected temperature of 2.1 billion year old planets.

A planet could possibly get into this situation by evaporating while orbiting inside the gaseous shell of the red giant and at the same time having its orbit decay due to bow-shock friction with the gas. Tides induce on the expanded star by the planet would also cause the orbit to decay, rather than expand as might have been expected to loss of gas from the star. These possibilities have been studied because that is the expected future of the Earth. Another hypothesis is that close-in planets could have formed during the merger of two white dwarfs.

The white dwarf was studied in detail in 2021, rejecting the idea of such a companion. An orbiting body should produce additional signals, such as changes in the photometric period. These additional signals are not detected and the researchers find multiple potential points of failure in the unipolar inductor model. The researchers conclude that the chromospheric emission is intrinsic and not due to a companion.

== DAHe prototype and explanation ==
The unusual spectroscopic features leads to the spectroscopic classification of DAHe (A=hydrogen, H=magnetic field without polarization, e=emission lines) for this white dwarf. Several other DAHe that are similar were found, making GD 356 the prototype of this spectral type. After the rejection of the unipolar inductor model for GD 356 another explanation was necessary. These DAHe systems all cluster closely in the Gaia Hertzsprung-Russell diagram (HR diagram). Therefore it was suspected that DAHe white dwarfs have strong magnetic fields due to a crystallization-driven convective dynamo. The cause for the emergence of emission lines was unclear at the time. It is suggested that DAHe white dwarfs are experiencing carbon–oxygen crystallization and distillation of ^{22}Neon inside these white dwarfs. The presence of distilled ^{22}Ne acts as a dynamo for a strong magnetic field that heats the atmosphere near the magnetic poles via ohmic heating. The equator experiences almost no heating. Misalignment between rotational axis and magnetic axis will cause the chromospheric emission line spots to rotate in and out of view, resulting in the observed variability. It is thought that the DAHe white dwarfs are the result of mergers between two objects, of which one is a carbon-oxygen core white dwarf and the other is a helium-core white dwarf or a subgiant. This is evident from the large amount of required ^{22}Ne, the high mass and the fast rotation of DAHe white dwarfs. More research is however needed, as there are two DAe white dwarfs without a detected magnetic field. They are thought to be similar to DAHe white dwarfs, as they cluster closely with DAHe in the Gaia HR diagram.
