= WD 1145+017 =

White dwarf in the constellation of Virgo

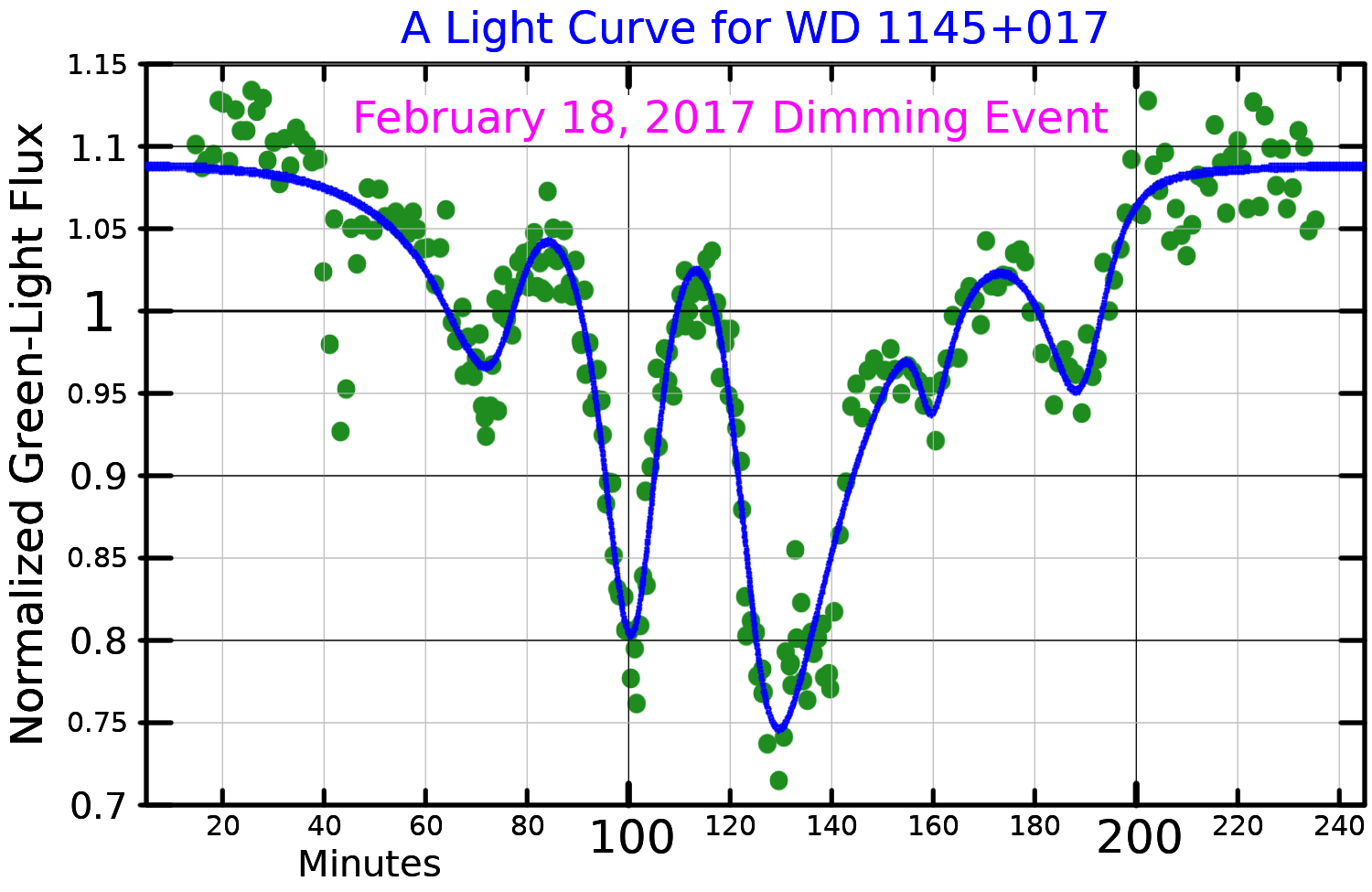
- A light curve for WD 1145+017 showing a dimming event, adapted from Xu et al. (2019). The green dots are the data points and the blue line is the best fit model from the Xu et al. paper.

Observation data Epoch J2000.0 Equinox ICRS
- Constellation: Virgo
- Right ascension: 11^{h} 48^{m} 33.62972^{s}
- Declination: +01° 28′ 59.4204″
- Apparent magnitude (V): 17.24±0.02

Characteristics
- Evolutionary stage: White dwarf
- Spectral type: DB

Astrometry
Proper motion (μ)	RA: −43.664 mas/yr Dec.: −4.027 mas/yr
Parallax (π)	6.8534±0.0907 mas
Distance	476 ± 6 ly (146 ± 2 pc)

Details
Mass	0.63±0.05 M_{☉}
Radius	0.012±0.001 R_{☉}
Luminosity	0.0088±0.0021 L_{☉}
Surface gravity (log g)	8.07±0.07 cgs
Temperature	15,020±520 K
Age	774±130 Myr

Other designations
- WD 1145+017, EPIC 201563164

Database references
SIMBAD	data

WD 1145+017 (also known as EPIC 201563164) is a white dwarf approximately 476 light-years (146 parsecs) from Earth in the constellation of Virgo. It is the first white dwarf to be observed with a transiting minor planet orbiting it.

== Stellar characteristics ==
The white dwarf has a mass of 0.6 M_{☉}, radius of 0.012 R_{☉} (1.34 R_{🜨}) and a temperature of 15,020 K, typical for white dwarf stars. It has been a white dwarf for 224 million years. The star's spectrum includes strong absorption lines due to magnesium, aluminium, silicon, calcium, iron and nickel. These elements commonly found in rocky planets are polluting the surface of the star, and would normally be expected to mix through the star and disappear from view after a million years.

A circumstellar dust cloud and disk (likely due to disintegrating asteroids, located at 97 to 103 R_wd, and emitting thermal IR radiation) surrounds the star. In addition, a circumstellar gas disk (located ~ 25 to 40 R_wd, and undergoing relativistic precession with a period of ~ 5 years) surrounds the star as well.

Based on 2018 studies and calculations, it is believed that the star initially was an early A-type main sequence star with a mass of about 2.48±0.14 M_{☉}, remaining so for an estimated 550±100 million years. Afterwards, following the exhaustion of hydrogen within its core, it evolved and expanded into a red giant before eventually ejecting its layers and contracting into a white dwarf, and has gradually cooled over the last 224±30 million years. This gives the star an estimated total age of around 774 million years.

The apparent magnitude of the star, or how bright it appears from Earth's perspective, is about 17. Therefore, it is too dim to be seen with the naked eye.

== Planetary system ==
The WD 1145+017 planetary system
Companion (in order from star)	Mass	Semimajor axis (AU)	Orbital period (days)	Eccentricity	Inclination (°)	Radius
b	~0.000016 M_{🜨}	~0.0054	0.187454(4)	—	~90	~0.03 R_{🜨}
Dusty disk	0.5? AU				—	—

The supposed planetesimal, WD 1145+017 b, with a 4.5 hour orbit, is being ripped apart by the star and is a remnant of the former planetary system that the star hosted before becoming a white dwarf. It is the first observation of a planetary object being shredded by a white dwarf. Several other large pieces have been seen in orbit as well. All the various larger pieces have orbits of 4.5 to 4.9 hours. Rocky material is raining down onto the star, and showing up in the star's spectrum. The system was detected by the Kepler space telescope in its extended K2 mission. Though the system was not a target of interest, it was within the field of view of observing sessions, and analysis of the observed data revealed the system.

An excess of infrared radiation indicates that there is a dusty disk with a temperature of 1,150 K (880 °C). Supporting observational data, along with data from the Chandra X-ray Observatory, were also found related to dust debris orbiting WD 1145+017.

== Similar systems ==
In September 2020, astronomers reported the discovery, for the first time, of a very massive Jupiter-sized planet, named WD 1856+534 b, closely orbiting, every 36 hours, a tiny white dwarf star, named WD 1856+534, a left-over remnant of an earlier much larger Sun-like star. This is the first true planet observed to transit a white dwarf, as opposed to the planetesimals transiting WD 1145+017.

== See also ==
- Disrupted planet
- List of stars that have unusual dimming periods
- List of exoplanets and planetary debris around white dwarfs

Other planetesimals around white dwarfs:

- ZTF J0139+5245
- WD 0145+234
- SDSS J1228+1040 b
- ZTF J0328-1219
