= Exoasteroid =

Asteroids found outside of the Solar System

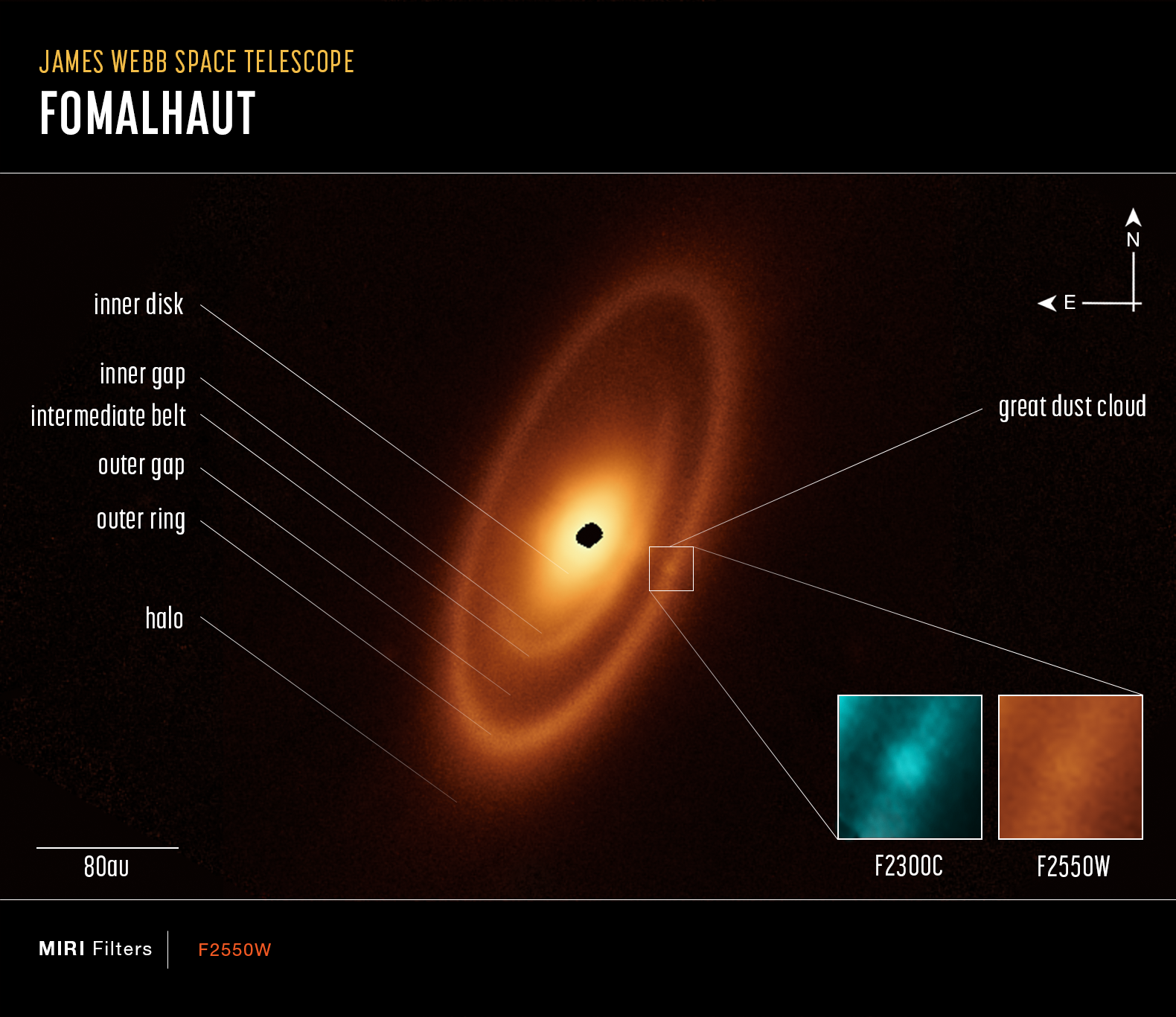
Exoasteroid belts around Fomalhaut (James Webb Space Telescope; 8 May 2023)

An exoasteroid, exo-asteroid, or extrasolar asteroid, is an asteroid located outside the Solar System.

== Evidence ==
Scientists suggest that exoasteroids may form through the fragmentation of exoplanets caused by interactions with gas giants. These exoasteroids are presumed to be the remnants of smaller celestial bodies that survived the destruction of their parent exoplanet. Similar processes are believed to have occurred during the early formation of the Solar System.

NASA has conducted studies in which simulations indicate that asteroid belts are likely to be a common feature around stars in planetary systems containing planets comparable in size to the inner and outer planets of the Solar System.

== History ==
In December 1988, American astrophysicists Benjamin Zuckerman and Eric Becklin identified a substantial circumstellar disc encircling the white dwarf star G 29-38, discovered from a near-infrared survey of 200 white dwarfs. Follow-up observations by Zuckerman and Becklin showed that the circumstellar disc emits significant radiation within the 2 to 5 micrometer range, indicating possible interactions between exoasteroids and surrounding material, which may result in their ejection into space. Later observations with the Spitzer Space Telescope in 2004 detected a dust cloud around G 29-38, thought to have formed from the disintegration of an exocomet or exoasteroid interacting with the white dwarf.

In May 2023, the James Webb Space Telescope captured images of Fomalhaut, a young star located 25 light-years (ly) from Earth. Analysis of these images, combined with simulations and testing of the star's asteroid belt, suggests that the belt likely formed through the debris from collisions among larger celestial bodies.

Another notable star hosting an asteroid belt is the white dwarf star WD 0145+234. It is hypothesized that the star previously hosted an exoasteroid or exoplanet, whose disruption led to the formation of a substantial exoasteroid belt. Given the star's dimensions, scientists infer that its accretion disk is highly active, regularly disrupting exoasteroids through gravitational interactions. In 2018, astronomers observed a 10% increase in the star's mid-infrared emission, consistent with the recent destruction of an exoasteroid and the resulting formation of a cloud of metallic dust partially obscuring WD 0145+234 from Earth.

== Detection ==
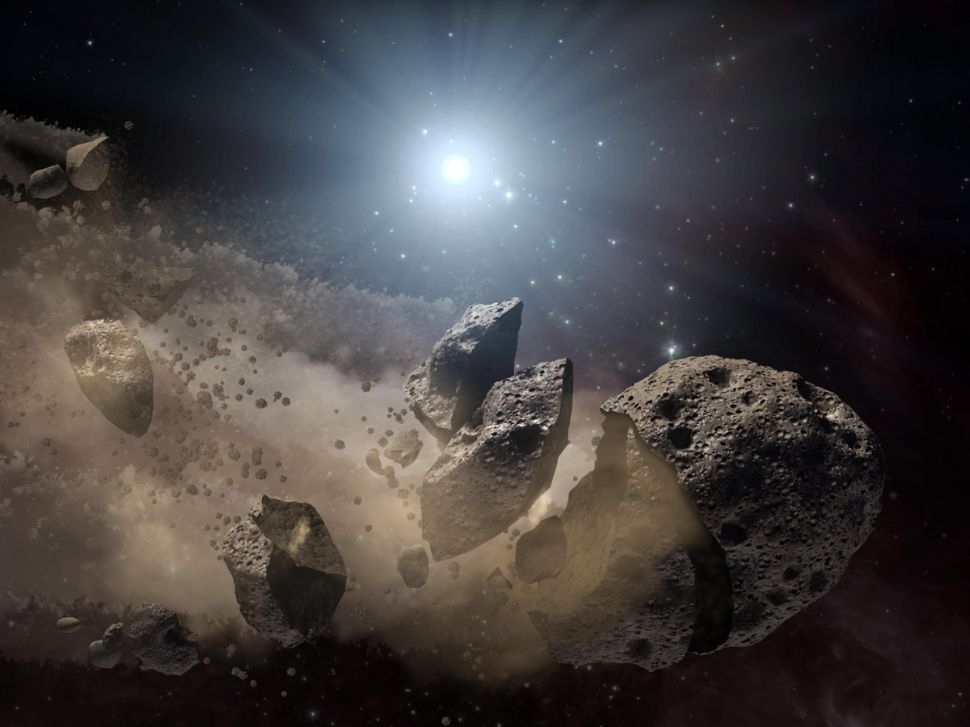
Artist's concept of an exoasteroid being disrupted by its star

In 2013, astronomers discovered fragmented remnants of an exoasteroid orbiting the star GD 61. Analysis revealed that the asteroid's surface was approximately 26% water by mass, similar to the ice found on the dwarf planet Ceres. This discovery suggests that a planet with liquid water may once have existed around the star. The asteroid is thought to have been disrupted by interactions with its host star, resulting in its fragmentation and the formation of an asteroid belt.

Subsequent observations using the Cosmic Origins Spectrograph on the Hubble Space Telescope identified magnesium, silicon, iron, and oxygen within the asteroid's water.

== See also ==
- Accretion disk
- Circumstellar disc
- Debris disk
- Disrupted planet
- List of exceptional asteroids
- Lost minor planet
- Protoplanetary disk
