= PSR J0337+1715 =

Millisecond pulsar with two orbiting white dwarfs in the constellation Taurus

Observation data Epoch J2000.0 Equinox ICRS
- Constellation: Taurus
- Right ascension: 03^{h} 37^{m} 43.8211^{s}
- Declination: +17° 15′ 14.886″
- Apparent magnitude (V): 18.00

Characteristics
- Evolutionary stage: Pulsar

Astrometry
| Radial velocity (R_{v}) | 29.7±0.3 km/s |
| Proper motion (μ) | RA: +4.51 mas/yr Dec.: +2.2 mas/yr |
| Parallax (π) | 0.5417±0.1951 mas |
| Distance | 4,200 ly (1,300±80 pc) |

Orbit
| Primary | Pulsar |
| Name | Inner white dwarf |
| Period (P) | 1.6293932 days |
| Semi-major axis (a) | 15.92827 lt-s (Note: Derived from the pulsar's motion and the mass ratio of the pulsar and the inner WD.) |
| Eccentricity (e) | 0.00069437 |
| Inclination (i) | 39.263° |
| Argument of periastron (ω) (secondary) | 97.5638° |

Orbit
| Primary | Inner pair |
| Name | Outer white dwarf |
| Period (P) | 327.25685 days |
| Semi-major axis (a) | 588.496 lt-s (Note: Derived from the pulsar's motion and the mass ratio of the inner pair and the outer WD.) |
| Eccentricity (e) | 0.03535596 |
| Inclination (i) | 0.0014° (to inner pair's orbital plane)° |
| Argument of periastron (ω) (secondary) | 95.6212° |

Details

Pulsar
| Mass | 1.4378 M_{☉} |
| Rotation | 2.73258863244 ms |
| Age | 2.45 Gyr |

Inner white dwarf
| Mass | 0.19751 M_{☉} |
| Radius | 0.091±0.005 R_{☉} |
| Luminosity | 0.34 (Note: Derived from the known radius and temperature of the object.) L_{☉} |
| Surface gravity (log g) | 5.82±0.05 cgs |
| Temperature | 14,600±400 K |

Outer white dwarf
| Mass | 0.4101 M_{☉} |
| Radius | 0.018 R_{☉} |
| Surface gravity (log g) | 7.5 cgs |
| Temperature | <20,000 K |

Other designations
- USNOA2 1050-00979270

Database references
| SIMBAD | data |

PSR J0337+1715 is a millisecond pulsar discovered in a Green Bank Telescope drift-scan survey from 2007. It is spinning 365.95 times per second (every 2.7325 milliseconds), 1,300 parsecs (4,200 ly) away in the constellation Taurus. It has a mass of just under 1.44 solar masses. It is the first pulsar found in a triple star system. It is co-orbiting very closely with another star, a white dwarf, and a second white dwarf further out (at a separation of 1.2 astronomical units) orbiting both the pulsar and the inner white dwarf with a period of roughly 11 months. The fact that the pulsar is part of a triple system provides an opportunity to test the nature of gravity and the strong equivalence principle, with a sensitivity several orders of magnitude greater than before it was discovered .

Results were published in 2018 showing that if there is any departure from the equivalence principle in the system it is no more than three parts per million at 95% confidence level, improved to two parts per million in 2020.

== Stellar system ==
| Pulsar |
| Period = 1.6293 days |
| Inner white dwarf |
| Period = 327.25 days |
| Outer white dwarf |

PSR J0337+1715 is a triple star system composed of one pulsar and two white dwarfs. The two white dwarfs orbit in effectively circular and coplanar orbits relative to each other. The optical component of the system is the inner white dwarf, which has a luminosity roughly a third that of the Sun. It is likely the progenitor of the neutron star had engulfed the progenitors of the white dwarfs in a common envelope event, and the neutron star was subsequently recycled into a millisecond pulsar by episodes of mass transfer by the progenitors of the white dwarfs.

== Planetary system ==
In 2022 evidence for a small planet with a mass comparable to that of the Moon on a wide orbit was found. In 2024, a study refined the planet's physical and orbital properties, finding that its mass is approximately 0.0041±0.003 M_{🜨}, or about 30% that of the Moon, making it one of the least massive known objects outside the Solar System. Its orbital parameters have been more thoroughly established, showing that it is on a slightly eccentric orbit lasting 3,310 days (or just over 9 years) which is also severely inclined relative to the plane of the triple system's orbit, suggesting it may have arrived there via influence from a Kozai mechanism.

Since PSR J0337+1715 (AB) b's orbit is relatively stable (for at least 100 million years), it may possibly be the last surviving member of a population of small objects which were formed after the progenitor of the pulsar in this system became a red supergiant, engulfing one of the two other stars and creating a common envelope between it and said star. The engulfed star was slowed down from the common envelope gas, transferring its orbital energy to that gas, causing it to expand and be expelled from the star, settling into a circumbinary disk where many small objects condensed from this gas. Of those, only PSR J0337+1715 (AB) b is still present, as all the others were on less stable orbits which likely got them ejected from the system or crashing into one of the stars.

A 2025 study on the current pulsar planet candidates strongly suggests that PSR J0337+1715 (AB) b is not real, and is merely an artifact of "red noise", which is a product of variability within the pulsar in the system, and can manifest as quasiperiodic modulations in pulsar timing data, which can be falsely reported as planetary candidates.

The PSR J0337+1715 planetary system
| Companion (in order from star) | Mass | Semimajor axis (AU) | Orbital period (days) | Eccentricity | Inclination (°) | Radius |
|---|---|---|---|---|---|---|
| b (unconfirmed) | 0.0041 M_{🜨} | 5.52 | 3,310 days | 0.257 | 119° | — |
