= List of transiting circumsecondary disks =

This is a list of binary systems that have a primary star eclipsed, as seen from Earth, by a circumstellar disk around the secondary (including possible ring systems). A circumsecondary disk is a disk of gas and/or dust around a star, white dwarf or substellar object that is a secondary in a star system. In rare cases the system can be aligned in a way that makes it possible for the circumsecondary disk to transit in front of the primary. In some cases the observed dips can be so deep that researchers describe these dimming events as occultations.

The object J1407b was considered a circumsecondary disk in the past, but later turned out to be more likely a free-floating planetary-mass object with a disk. PDS 110 is a candidate with uncertain status, as later eclipses did not occur. VVV-WIT-07, ASASSN-V J192543.72+402619.0, ASASSN-21co, FY Scuti, OGLE-BLG182.1.162852, and ZTF J185259.31+124955.2 are candidates without much modelling of the disk.

== List of transiting disks ==
Name of the primary	Spectral type primary	Secondary object classification	Orbital separation (AU)	Orbital period (years)	Disk radius (AU)	Reference
Giant stars with possible mass transfer to the secondary in the past
AS Leonis Minoris (TYC 2505-672-1)	M2III	B-type hot subdwarf	16.7–31.2 or 26.7	69.1	0.85–3.15 or 3.75	
Epsilon Aurigae	F0II–III?	B5V-star	18.1+1.2 −1.3	27.1	3.8+0.1 −0.4	
VVV-WIT-08	giant between K7 and M2	object of unknown nature		>11	>0.25	
Eta Geminorum	M3.5 Ib-II	star (about 2 M_{☉})	7.8	8.2	>0.75	
Gaia17bpp	M0III	star		>6.5	1.4	
EE Cephei	B5III (Be star)	star		5.6	0.13	
OGLE LMC-ECL-11893	B9III: (Be star)	old low-mass object	1.7	1.3	0.2	
MWC 882	A0 (accretor, post-Algol variable)	B7 (donor, post-RGB)	0.53	0.20	0.28 (around primary)	
Young systems (secondary is star)
V773 Tauri	binary: K3Ve (Li)	binary star (two 1.5 M_{☉} stars)	15.35±0.45	26.5	5	
Secondary possibly substellar object or planet
ASASSN-21js	early-type star	substellar object (brown dwarf or smaller)	~13,000	~610,000	1.055	
ASASSN-24fw	main-sequence F-type	candidate 0.5–19 M_{J} object, or >3.42 M_{J}	14 or 17	44	0.7 or 0.17	
Gaia21bcv	K4.5V (young star)	low-mass star, brown dwarf or planet	<225	<3375	0.5	
ASASSN-V J060000.76–310027.83	early K-dwarf	object of unknown nature		~82	~0.5	
EPIC 204376071	M5.3 (young star)	about 3 M_{J} object		>0.22	0.012 (2.60 R_{☉})	
V928 Tauri	M0.8 (young binary)	substellar object with high mass (at least >50 M_{J})	<3.2	0.18–2.8	0.006 (1.39 R_{☉})	
EPIC 220208795	early K-dwarf	>1.5 M_{J} object	1.20–1.44 (aphelion)	0.65–0.80	0.005 (1.14 R_{☉})	
KIC 10403228	M	0.88 or 1.44 R_{J} object		450	0.0012 or 0.0017 (2.6 or 3.7 R_{J})	
Sun	G2V	Saturn (planet; included for comparison)	9.5826 AU	29.4475	0.00091 AU (Note: Outer edge of Saturn's A ring.)	
HIP 41378	late F-type star	HIP 41378 f (12 M_{🜨} planet, with radius of 3.7 R_{🜨} if it has rings)	1.37	1.49	0.0004 (9.6 R_{🜨})	
K2-33	M dwarf (young star)	K2-33b (planet)	0.0409	0.015 (5.424 days)	0.0002 (5 R_{🜨})	

== See also ==
- List of stars that have unusual dimming periods
- List of resolved circumstellar disks
