= RZ Piscium =

Star in the constellation Pisces

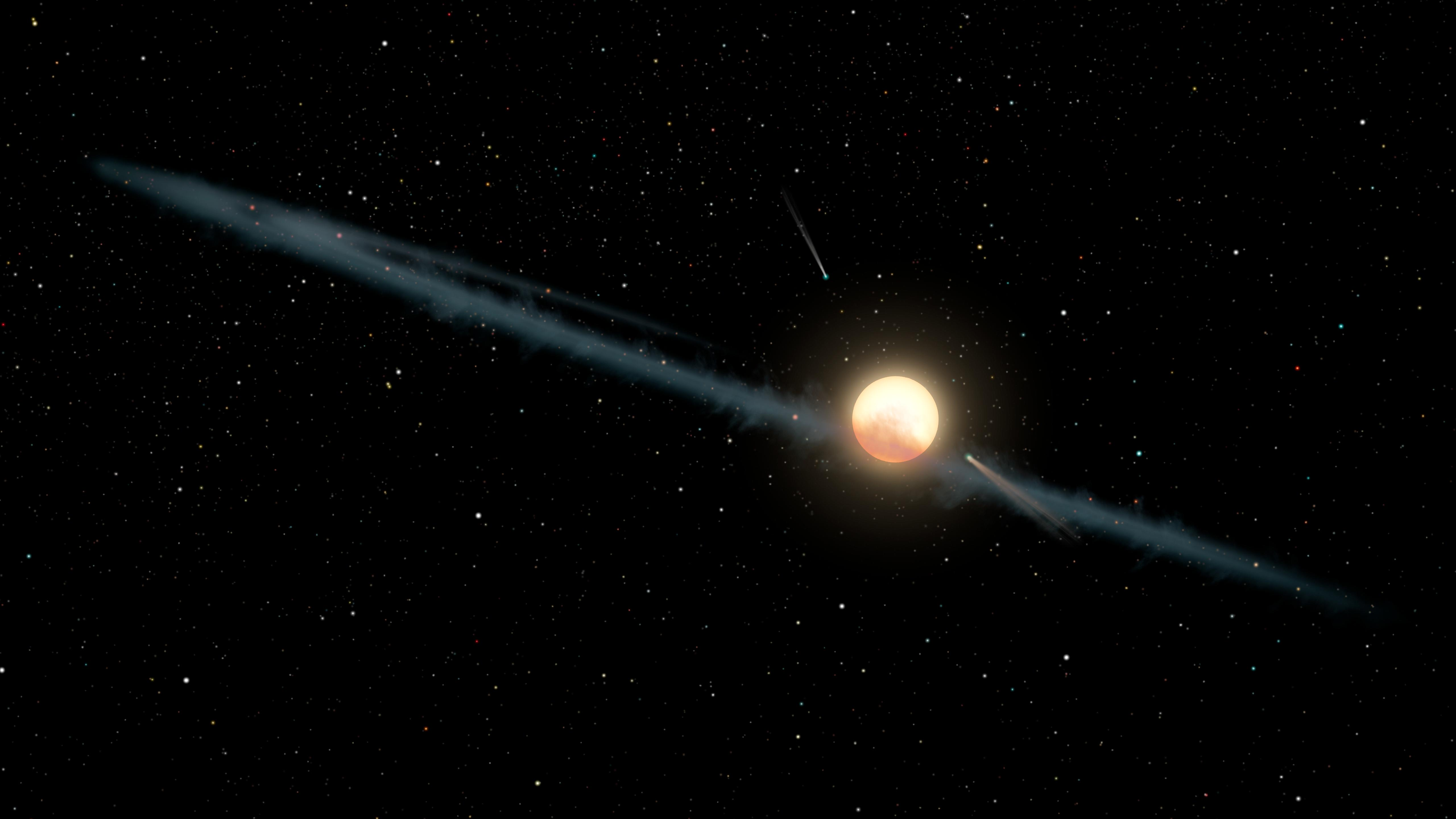
- Dust and debris orbiting a star (artist's concept)

Observation data Epoch J2000 Equinox ICRS
- Constellation: Pisces
- Right ascension: 01^{h} 09^{m} 42.0522^{s}
- Declination: +27° 57′ 01.910″
- Apparent magnitude (V): 11.29 - 13.82

Characteristics
- Spectral type: K0IV
- Variable type: UX Ori

Astrometry
Proper motion (μ)	RA: 27.544(28) mas/yr Dec.: −12.521(19) mas/yr
Parallax (π)	5.3661±0.0274 mas
Distance	608 ± 3 ly (186.4 ± 1.0 pc)

Details

RZ Piscium A
Radius	1.0 R_{☉}
Luminosity	0.8 L_{☉}
Temperature	5,600 K (5,330 °C); 5,620 K (5,350 °C); 5,870 K (5,600 °C) K
Age	30 − 50 Myr

RZ Piscium B
Mass	0.12 M_{☉}

Other designations
- RZ Psc, TYC 1753-1498-1, 2MASS J01094205+2757020

Database references
SIMBAD	data

RZ Piscium (or RZ Psc) is a UX Orionis type variable star 608 light-years (186 pc) away, in the constellation Pisces. Over the years, the star has been found to brighten and dim erratically, dimming by as much as a tenth of its usual luminosity. RZ Piscium has been found to emit large amounts of infrared radiation, suggesting the presence of a substantial mass of gas and dust orbiting the star, possibly from a "disrupted planet".

== Disrupted planet ==
Because of the infrared excess and rapid light variations, astronomers conclude that:

destruction of one or more massive orbiting bodies has recently occurred within 1 au of the star, and we are viewing the aftermath of such an event along the plane of the orbiting debris.

According to astronomer Ben Zuckerman:

Most sun-like stars have lost their planet-forming disks within a few million years of their birth. The fact that RZ Piscium hosts so much gas and dust after tens of millions of years means it is probably destroying, rather than building, planets.

== Observations ==
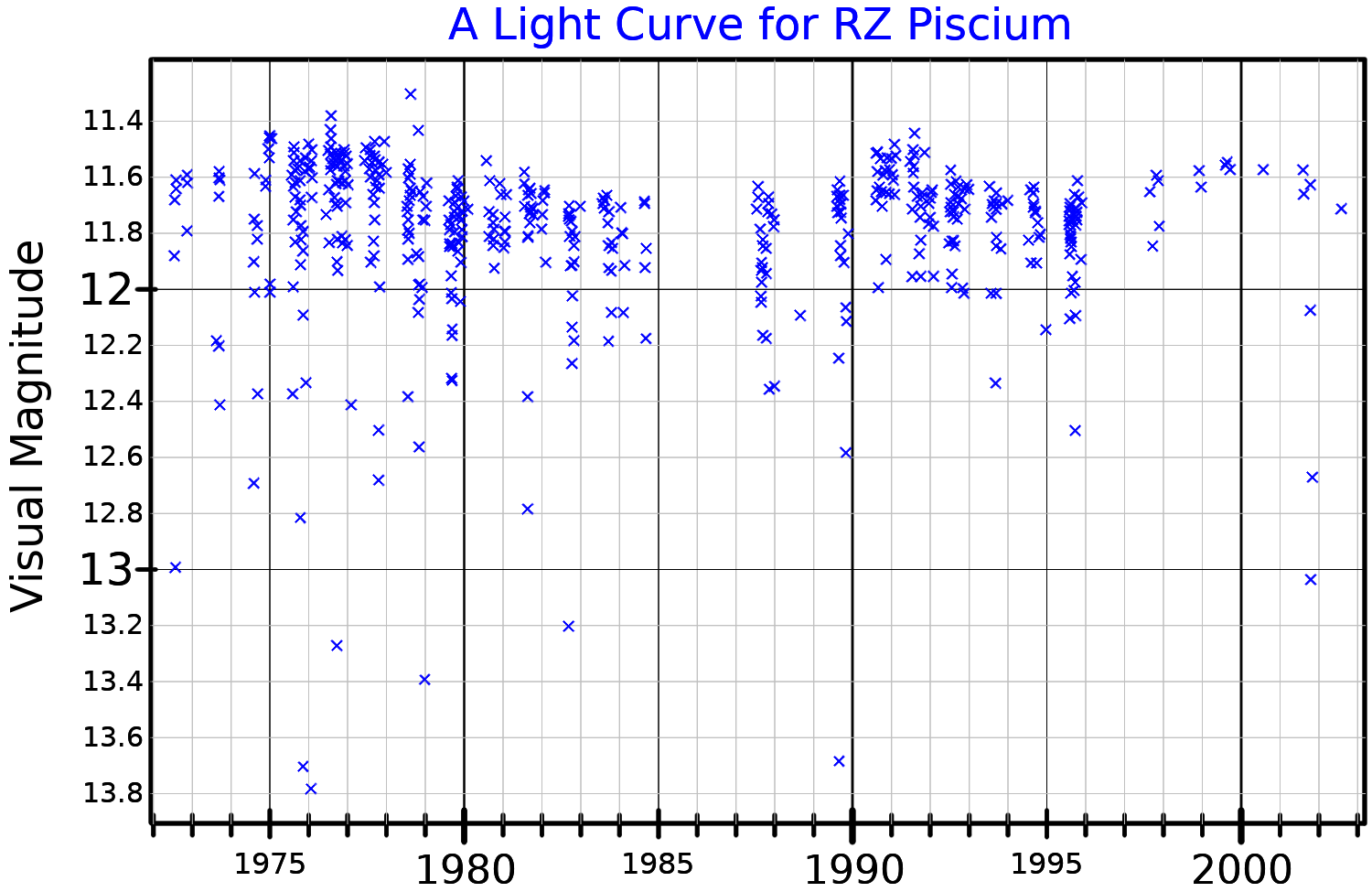
A visual band light curve for RZ Piscium, adapted from Shakhovskoǐ et al. (2003)

In 2017, RZ Piscium was studied using the XMM-Newton satellite, the Shane 3-meter telescope at Lick Observatory in California and the 10-meter Keck I telescope at W. M. Keck Observatory in Hawaii. The temperature of the star was found to be about the same as the Sun (5,600 K (5,330 °C)). Further, the star was found to produce about a thousand times more x-rays than the Sun, suggesting that the star is relatively young. On the other hand, RZ Piscium was found to contain a relatively small amount of surface lithium, which suggests the star is between 30 − 50 million years old; this is somewhat "old" for a star with so much circumstellar dust. Most young stars that are as dusty as RZ Piscium may be producing planets, but given its relatively advanced age, RZ Piscium may be destroying and consuming its planets instead.

In 2020, a red dwarf companion with the mass of 0.12 Solar mass was detected with a projected separation of 23 AU from the primary star. The incandescence of the companion star thus make up about one third of excess infrared emission previously attributed to the dust.

Observations with TESS did result in the detection of 24 transits by exocomets. The transits have absorption depths between 1-20%. This is the second system, after Beta Pictoris that shows a large population of comets. The transit rate is about double compared to Beta Pictoris, with 0.40 exocomets per day for RZ Piscium. The exocomets have a size of 1–7 km.

== See also ==
- List of stars that have unusual dimming periods
