= Gaia17bpp =

M-type star in the constellation Sagitta

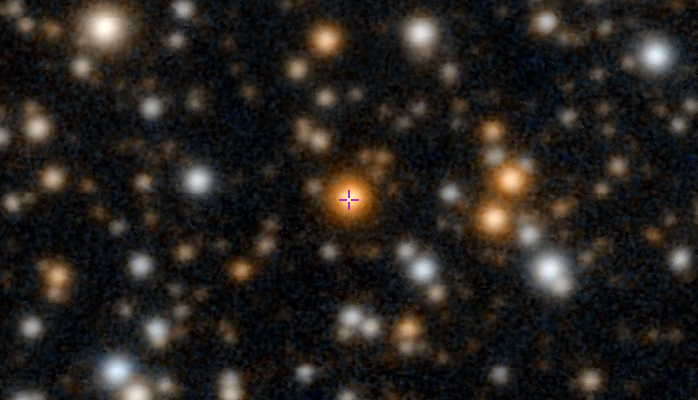
- An optical image of Gaia17bpp, captured by the Pan-STARRS1 telescope.

Observation data Epoch J2000 Equinox ICRS
- Constellation: Sagitta
- Right ascension: 19^{h} 37^{m} 23.16^{s}
- Declination: +17° 59′ 02.9″

Characteristics
- Evolutionary stage: Red giant branch
- Spectral type: M0-III
- J−K color index: 1.7

Astrometry
Parallax (π)	−0.18±0.4 mas (Note: Derived distance using photogeometric distance posterior distribution (Bailer-Jones et al. 2021))

Details
Mass	1.5 M_{☉}
Radius	45 R_{☉}
Temperature	3,850 K

Other designations
- AT 2017exj, 2MASS J19372316+1759029, Gaia DR3 1824311891830344704

Database references
SIMBAD	data

Gaia17bpp is an M-type red giant star that exhibited a single large dimming event (G-16-20.5 mag) over 6.5 years. It is located in the constellation Sagitta and is about 27,600 light years away from Earth.

== Astronomical characteristics ==
The variable star is located in the constellation of Sagitta roughly 27,600 ly (8.5 kpc). Current hypothesis and archival data suggest that Gaia17bpp belongs to a rare family of ultra-long period binary stars where the companion is enshrouded in large optically thick disks reminiscent of Epsilon Aurigae, VVV-WIT-07, and AS Leonis Minoris. The proposed secondary star and disk remain unconfirmed due to the copious amount of intervening interstellar dust, and likely due to the remarkable long timescale period of the system.

== Discovery and dimming event ==
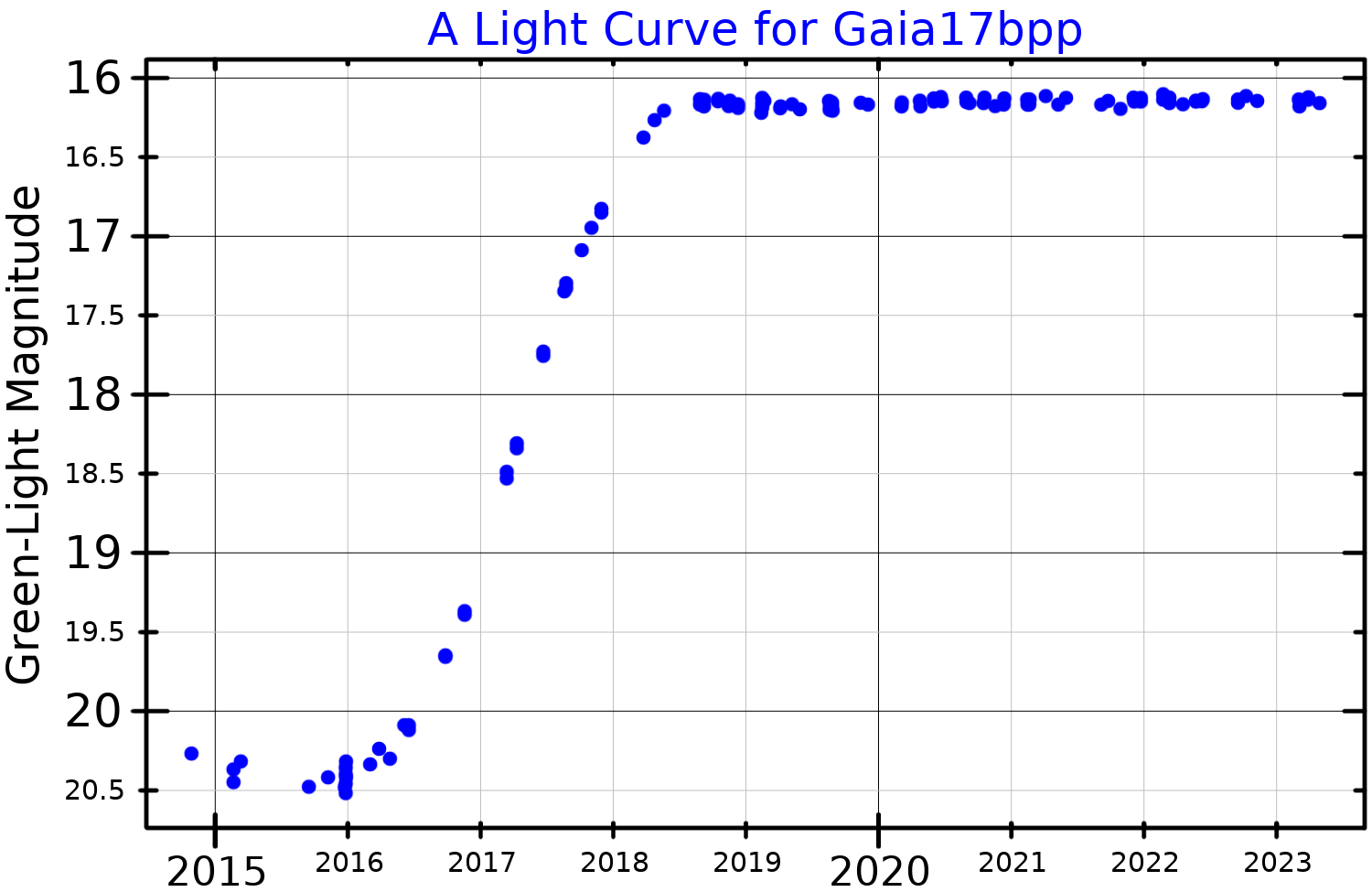
A light curve for Gaia17bpp, showing the recovery from the dimming event. Adapted from Tzanidakis et al.

Gaia17bpp was initially discovered through the ESA's Gaia Photometric Science Alerts (GPSA) in 2022 by astronomers at the University of Washington. The remarkable Gaia17bpp dimming event occurred in mid 2012, however the GPSA issued an alert back in 2017 when the star began re-brightening. Due to the long duration of the dimming event, the entirety of the Gaia17bpp dimming event was recovered from several public data archives such as Pan-STARRS, and NASA's Wide-field Infrared Survey Explorer (WISE) where the dimming event was also observed in the near-infrared.

Researchers employed archival image searching and conducted spectroscopic follow-up observations on Gaia17bpp using the Apache Point Observatory 3.5m ARC Telescope. Throughout their analysis, they successfully ruled out several suspected variable star classes with similar dimming event such as R Coronae Borealis, Cataclysmic variable star, or Young stellar object.

Modeling of the dimming event suggest that a possible scenario includes the occultation of an extended oblate optically thick disk with 1.4 AU radius, moving with a transverse velocity of approximately 0.005 km/s. It is unclear how such large optically thick disks can form such in the case of Gaia17bpp and other analog systems. One study suggests that previous mass-transfer interaction between a close binary can produce large disks and lose angular momentum to produce the observed long period binary system.

Animation of optical images of Gaia17bpp dimming event seen from the Asteroid Terrestrial Last Alert System (ATLAS).

== See also ==
- Epsilon Aurigae
- List of stars that have unusual dimming periods
- Tabby's Star
