= KH 15D =

Binary star system in the constellation Monoceros

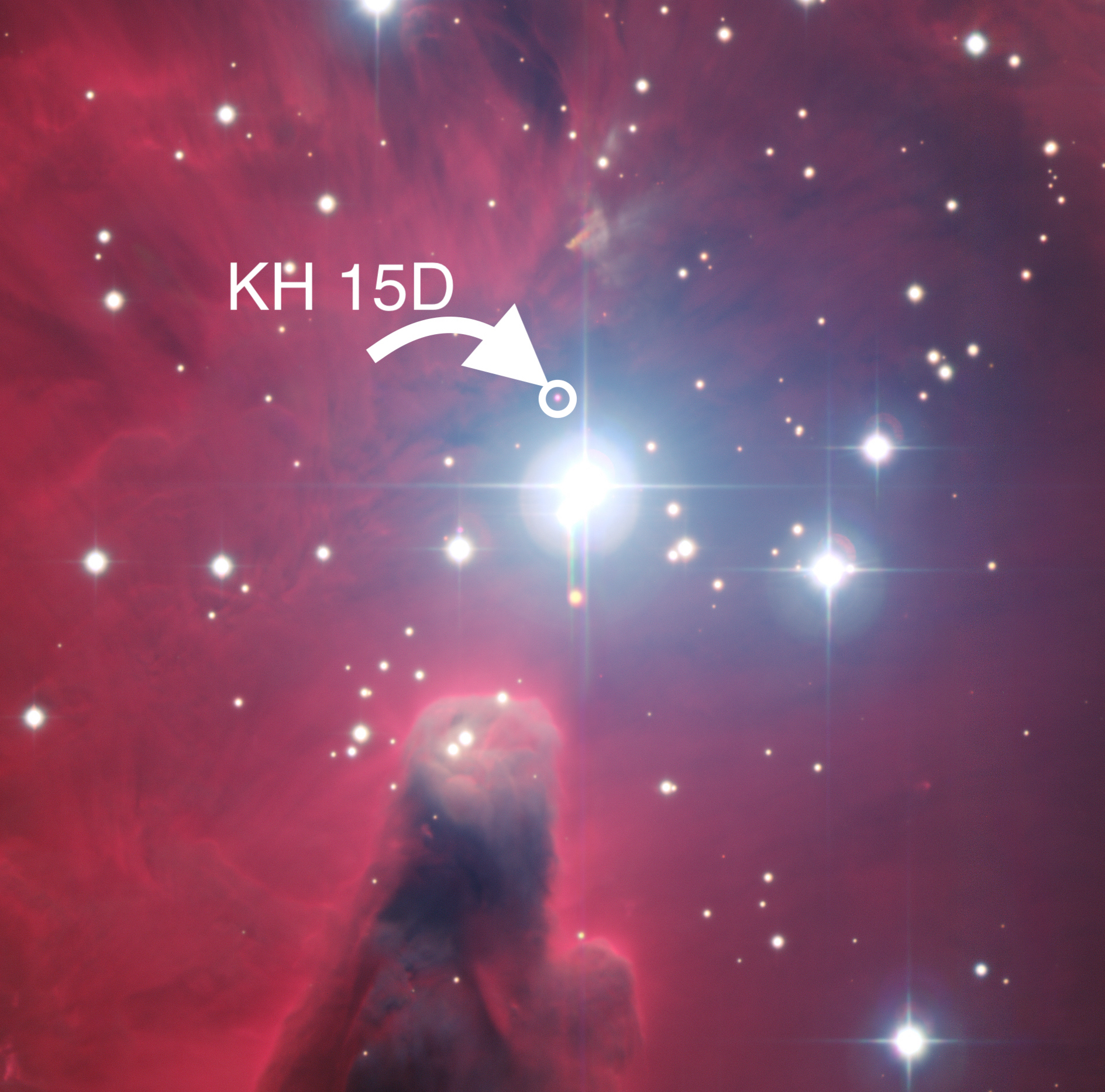
- KH 15D in NGC 2264; Credit: ESO

Observation data Epoch J2000.0 Equinox J2000.0
- Constellation: Monoceros
- Right ascension: 06^{h} 41^{m} 10.31^{s}
- Declination: +09° 28′ 33.2″
- Apparent magnitude (V): 15.5 - 21.5

Characteristics

A
- Evolutionary stage: Pre-main-sequence
- Spectral type: K7
- Apparent magnitude (V): 16.039±0.003
- Apparent magnitude (R): 15.257±0.005
- Apparent magnitude (I): 14.489±0.001
- Apparent magnitude (J): 13.504±0.017
- Apparent magnitude (H): 12.825±0.015
- Apparent magnitude (K): 12.541±0.014
- Variable type: T Tauri star

B
- Evolutionary stage: Pre-main-sequence
- Spectral type: K1±0.5
- Apparent magnitude (V): 15.509±0.009
- Apparent magnitude (R): 14.776±0.008
- Apparent magnitude (I): 14.198±0.009
- Apparent magnitude (J): 13.285±0.010
- Apparent magnitude (H): 12.570±0.013
- Apparent magnitude (K): 12.421±0.022
- Variable type: T Tauri star

Astrometry

A
Parallax (π)	1.27±0.08 mas
Distance	773+50.0 −43.6 pc
Absolute magnitude (M_{V})	6.756±0.055

B
Parallax (π)	1.27±0.08 mas
Distance	773+50.0 −43.6 pc
Absolute magnitude (M_{V})	6.226±0.056

Orbit
Primary	B
Name	A
Period (P)	48.37 days
Semi-major axis (a)	0.25 AU
Eccentricity (e)	0.574±0.017
Inclination (i)	92.5±2.5°

Details

A
Mass	0.715±0.005 M_{☉}
Radius	1.41±0.05 R_{☉}
Temperature	3970±40 K

B
Mass	0.74+0.09 −0.04 M_{☉}
Radius	1.52±0.16 R_{☉}
Temperature	4140±155 K

Other designations
- V582 Monocerotis

Database references
SIMBAD	data

KH 15D (V582 Monocerotis), described as a winking star because of its unusual dips in brightness, is a binary T Tauri star system embedded in a circumbinary disk. It is a member of the young open cluster NGC 2264, located about 2,500 light-years (770 pc) from the Sun in the constellation of Monoceros.

== Discovery ==
The unique brightness variations of KH 15D were discovered at Wesleyan University's Van Vleck Observatory in 1995 by Dr. William Herbst and his then-master's student Kristin Kearns. The star was found to alternate, on a 48.37-day period between a brighter "on" state and a fainter "off" state that was less than 4% of the bright state (or up to 96% dimmed). As the years went by, the star spent more and more time "off", such that by 2010 it was always in the faint state, although still periodically variable. In 2012 it unexpectedly began to "wink" on and off again and has now entered a phase where its "on" state is almost twice as bright as it was in the mid-1990s (see light curve).

== Hypotheses ==
A consensus model of this puzzling behavior has emerged, which attributes the winking to the rising and setting of one star relative to the edge of a circumbinary ring that occults part of the orbit. Precession of the ring has caused the gradual evolution of the winking behavior as shown in the diagrams below. Radial velocity measurements confirmed the system as a spectroscopic binary composed of two weak-lined T Tauri stars.

The orbit of the binary system is nearly edge-on to our line of sight and the circumbinary disk is tilted with respect to that orbit, resulting in nodal precession. At the time of the 1996 observation only one star (designated star A) was visible while the occulting ring fully blocked the light from star B. The winking observed was caused by star A rising and setting from behind the ring. By 2010, the ring covered both stars and the system was permanently in the "off" state, being seen only by scattered light off the ring. By 2018, star B was fully uncovered and star A fully occulted. Star B has turned out to be somewhat brighter, hotter and more massive than star A, but the labels have not been changed since this might cause confusion in the literature.

The importance of KH 15D derives from the unique opportunity it provides to study the terrestrial planet formation zone of a protoplanetary disk. From its rate of precession it is known that the occulting ring is located about 3 AU from the stars, which would put it at the asteroid belt in the Solar System. The age of KH 15D is around 3 Myr and its total mass is around 1.5 solar masses, so the system may provide some guidance on when and how planetesimals – the precursors of planets such as the Earth – form. The regular occultations also provide opportunities to study the magnetospheres and photospheres of T Tauri stars in unprecedented detail.

== The Disk ==
=== Composition ===
Though the composition of the disk is not known for sure, there has been evidence of methane and water ice features with grain sizes of 1-50 μm.

=== Bipolar outflows ===
It has also been observed that there are bipolar outflow jets inclined by 84% coming from the disk itself. Both hydrogen and carbon dioxide outflows have been observed extending from the north and south sides of the disk. These observations have led to an upper mass limit of 3.2266e27 kg for the disk.

== Gallery ==
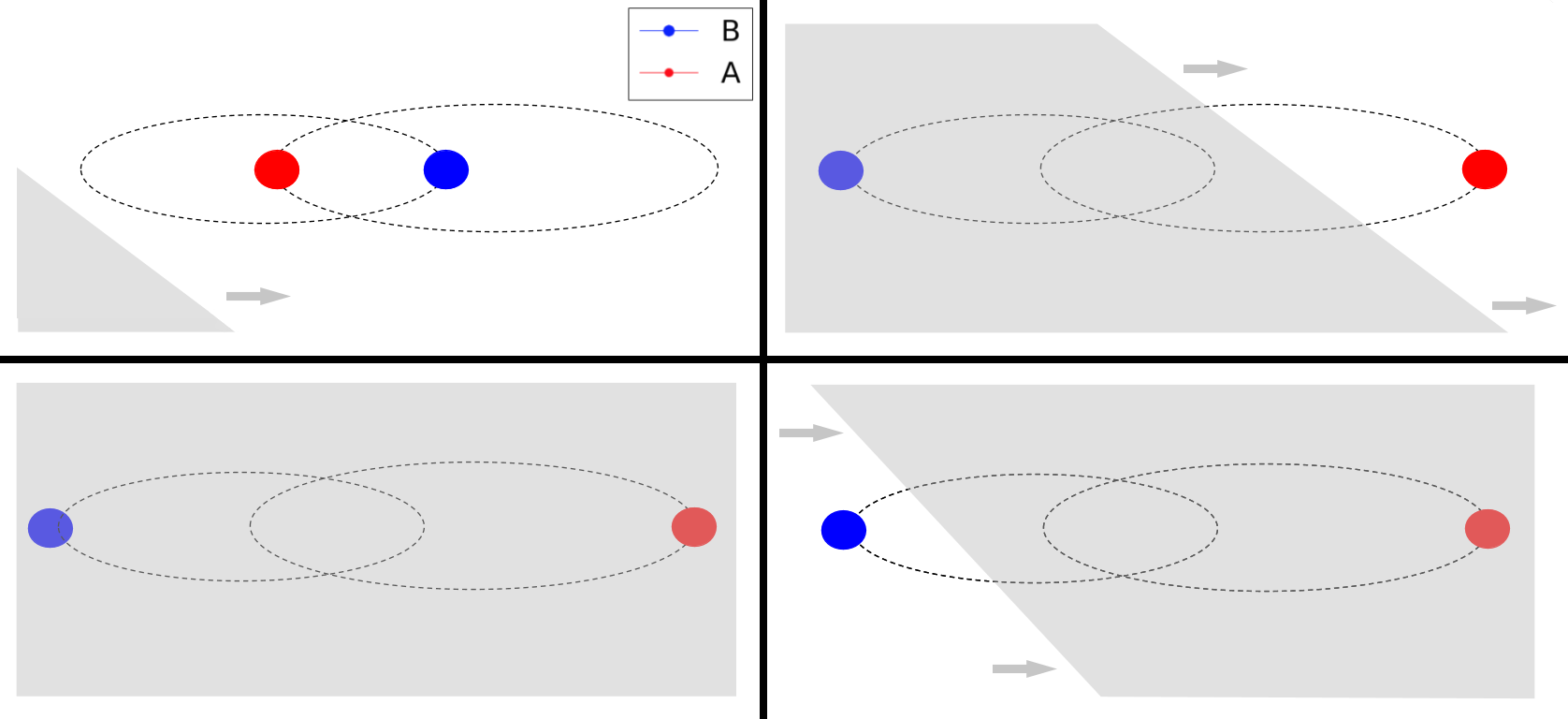
The "advancing screen", as represented by the gray screen, moves across the binary orbit of Star B (blue circle) and Star A (red circle) in the direction of the arrows at a speed of 15 m/s. In the top left image, both of the stars are unobscured by the circumbinary ring. In the top right image, the screen fully occults the orbit of Star B, and part of star A's orbit. This allows Star A to "rise" and "set", or appear to be "winking". The bottom left shows the screen block both orbits, which occurred in 2010 until 2012. The bottom right shows the current state of the system, the orbit of Star A is occulted while Star B "rises" and "sets", as Star A previously did. Other visual representations could be found in the following papers: Winn et al. 2006, Capelo et al. 2012, Arulanantham et al. 2017, and the one that inspired this image, Aronow et al. 2018.

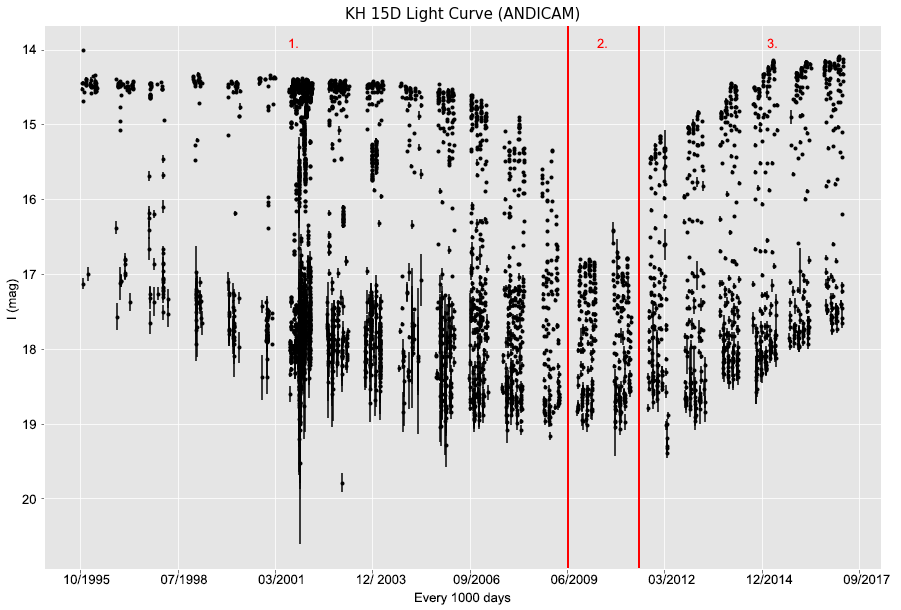
This graph shows the brightness over time for the KH 15D System. When both stars appear (not shown here) the system is brightest, and when neither star appears, the system is dimmest. The numbers represent different stages of the system: 1. Star A "rises" and "sets", while the disk occults Star B. Thus, most of the brightness comes from Star A. 2. Both Star A and B are occulted, but instead of a reading of zero magnitudes the scattered light is seen. 3. Star B "rises" and "sets", while the disk occults Star A, so most of the brightness is from Star B. From the light curve, Star B is brighter than Star A, marking it the primary star.

== See also ==
- Disrupted planet
- List of stars that have unusual dimming periods
