= HD 139139 =

Star system in the constellation Libra

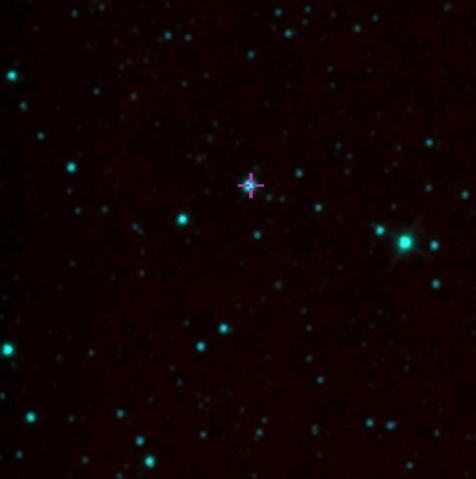
- Star field around HD 139139 (north is up, field is approximately 20′ wide)

Observation data Epoch J2000 Equinox J2000
- Constellation: Libra
- Right ascension: 15^{h} 37^{m} 06.215^{s}
- Declination: −19° 08′ 33.08″
- Apparent magnitude (V): 9.84

Characteristics
- Evolutionary stage: main sequence
- Spectral type: G3/G5V

Astrometry
Radial velocity (R_{v})	+16.36 km/s
Proper motion (μ)	RA: −67.475 mas/yr Dec.: −92.600 mas/yr
Parallax (π)	9.3455±0.0144 mas
Distance	349.0 ± 0.5 ly (107.0 ± 0.2 pc)

Details
Radius	1.14 R_{☉}
Luminosity (bolometric)	1.29 L_{☉}
Temperature	5,766 K
Rotation	14.5 d
Age	1.5±0.4 Gyr

Other designations
- BD−18°4107, PPM 717808, EPIC 249706694, TIC 70652803, TYC 6193-969-1, GSC 06193-00969, 2MASS J15370623−1908329, DENIS J153706.2−190832, Gaia DR1 6254212216862625024, Gaia DR2 6254212221163830016, Gaia DR3 6254212221163830016, RAVE J153706.2−190833, USNO‑B1.0 0708-00306171

Database references
SIMBAD	data

HD 139139 (also known as EPIC 249706694) is likely part of a bound pair system of main sequence stars about 350 light-years (110 parsecs) away from Earth in the constellation Libra. HD 139139 is a G-type main-sequence star, a little larger and more luminous than the Sun, and at an almost identical temperature. It has an apparent magnitude of 9.8. The companion star is thought to be a K5-K7 red dwarf 3.3″ away from HD 139139. It is about three magnitudes fainter and has a temperature of between 4,100 and 4,300 K. Both stars have a similar proper motion, meaning they may form a gravitationally-bound binary pair.

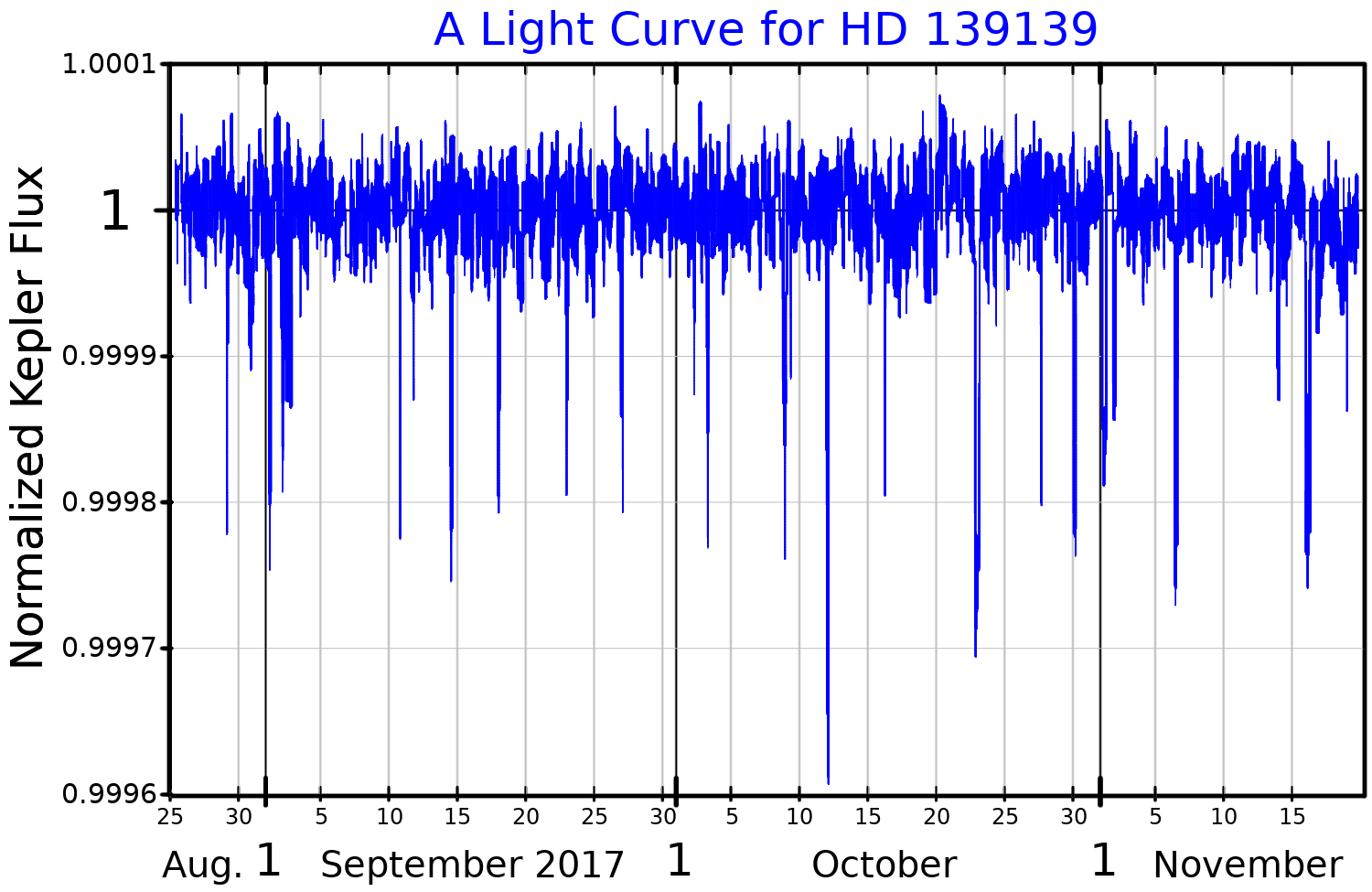
A light curve for HD 139139 showing the irregularly spaced dimmings, adapted from Rappaport et al. (2019)

HD 139139 exhibits dips in brightness similar to those caused by transiting Earth-like planets. The Kepler space telescope observed 28 dips in their brightness over an 87-day period (23 August – 20 November 2017). The dips do not appear to be periodic as would be expected if they were due to transiting planets.

It is unknown which of the two stars produces the dimming events. Potential explanations that have been investigated include planets transiting a binary star, planets that are perturbing the orbits of each other producing large transit timing variations, a disintegrating planet, large dust producing asteroids, and short lived sunspots. According to Andrew Vanderburg, one of the researchers of the original studies,

In astronomy we have a long history of not understanding something, thinking it’s aliens, and later finding out it’s something else ... The odds are pretty good that it’s going to be another one of those.

Subsequent observations performed with CHEOPS in two observing campaigns in the years 2021 and 2022 detected no transit-like events. The team estimated 4.8% probability of having missed all of them by chance, assuming that the frequency of the events remained unchanged from the 2017 measurements by Kepler. While it is possible that the events detected by Kepler were real, but inactive during observations by CHEOPS, the team also noted that it is not possible to discard also the possibility that they were caused by unidentified and infrequent instrumentation error.

== Background ==
HD 139139 was identified as unusual by two independent groups of visual surveyors (citizen scientists) working in collaboration with professional astronomers.

"But some of these patterns are too complex for computers to tease out; volunteer citizen scientists also comb through the Kepler catalogue, using the human brain's power to uncover surprising signals. In spring 2018 some of these citizen astronomers contacted Vanderburg and told him to check out HD 139139, a sunlike star roughly 350 light-years away."

HD 139139 is one of the 0.5% of stars in the sky that can see Earth transit, according to Andrew Vanderburg. "The transit impact parameter would be close to 0.9, so they can just barely see us – the transit duration would be only about 40% the duration we'd expect for a perfectly edge-on transit."

== See also ==
- Tabby's Star
- List of stars that have unusual dimming periods
