= List of stars that have unusual dimming periods =

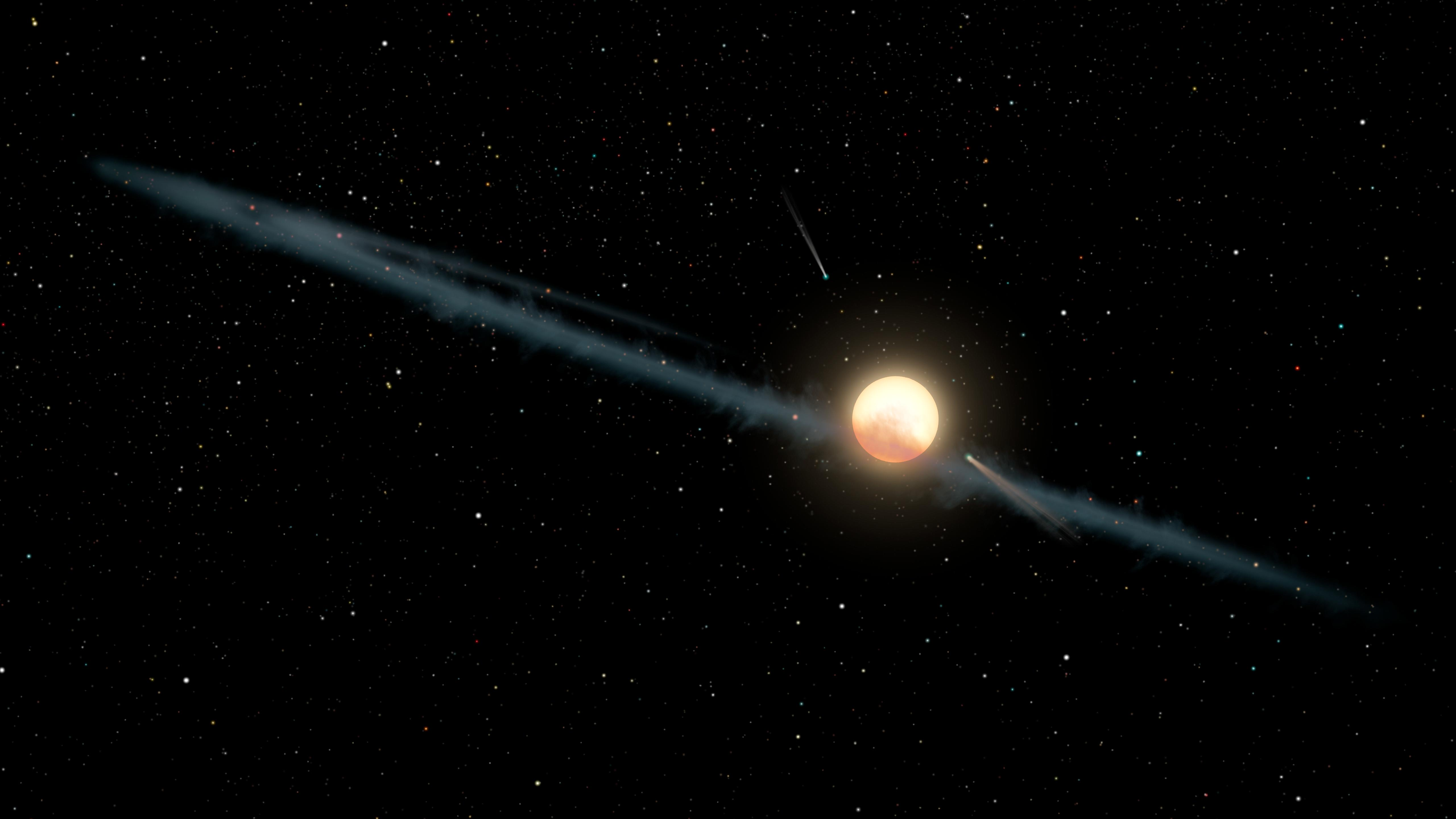
Artist's concept of an "uneven ring of dust" orbiting KIC 8462852, also known as Tabby's Star

This list contain stars that had periods when their apparent magnitude dropped in a way that is not typical of any class of variable stars. Most of these dimming events happened due to an occultation by a dust cloud or dust disk, but many remain without explanation.

== List ==
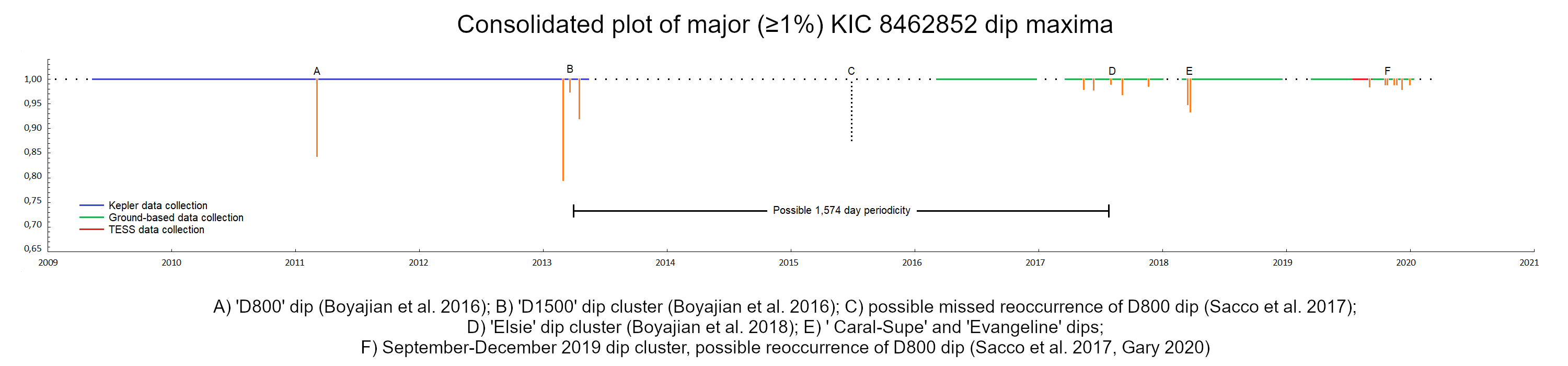
Tabby's Star (KIC 8462852) – Consolidated plot of all known dimmings (1 March 2020)

Star designation	Stellar class	Magnitude		Right ascension (J2000)	Declination (J2000)	Distance (light-years)	Reason for dimming
Star designation	Stellar class	Apparent	Absolute	Right ascension (J2000)	Declination (J2000)	Distance (light-years)	Reason for dimming
ASASSN-V J193622.23+115244.1	—	14.0–15.5	—	19^{h} 36^{m} 22.23^{s}	+11° 52′ 44.1″	6592	Unknown
ASASSN-V J213939.3-702817.4	F0V	12.95–14.22	2.5	21^{h} 39^{m} 39.3^{s}	−70° 28′ 17.4″	3630	Unknown
Betelgeuse	M1-2	+0.50	—	05^{h} 55^{m} 10.30536^{s}	+07° 24′ 25.4304″	—	"large-grain circumstellar dust"
EPIC 204278916	M1	13.7	—	16^{h} 02^{m} 07.576^{s}	−22° 57′ 46.89″	—	Dust disk
ASASSN-24fw		14	17	17^{h} 05^{m} 18.98^{s}	06° 12′ 19.5″	3290±60	Circumplanetary disk around an orbiting planet
EPIC 204376071	M	—	—	16^{h} 04^{m} 10.1267^{s}	−22° 34′ 45.5503″	440	Possibly giant planet or brown dwarf with rings
HD 139139 (EPIC 249706694)	G3/5V	9.84; 9.677	—	15^{h} 37^{m} 06.215^{s}	−19° 08′ 32.96″	350; 572	Unknown. Observed dimmings may have been due to instrumental errors.
KH 15D	K7	15.5–21.5	6.226	06^{h} 41^{m} 10.31^{s}	+09° 28′ 33.2″	773	Possibly circumbinary disk
KIC 4150611 (HD 181469)	Pulsator/K/M/G	—	—	19^{h} 18^{m} 58.21759^{s}	+39° 16′ 01.7913″	—	Five-star system
PDS 110	keF6 IVeb	10.422	2.54	05^{h} 23^{m} 31.008^{s}	–01° 04′ 23.68″	1090	Possibly eclipses by circumstellar dust
RW Cephei	K2 0-Ia	6.0–7.6	—	22^{h} 23^{m} 07.01521^{s}	+55° 57′ 47.6244″	11,000 (Note: Assuming membership to Cepheus OB1)	Great dimming event similar to Betelgeuse
RZ Piscium	K0 IV	11.29–13.82	—	01^{h} 09^{m} 42.056^{s}	+27° 57′ 1.95″	550	Substantial mass of gas and dust, possibly from disrupted planet
Tabby's Star (KIC 8462852)	F3V	11.705	3.08	20^{h} 06^{m} 15.4527^{s}	+44° 27′ 24.791″	1470	Unknown
TIC 400799224	—	—	—	—	—	—	"probably from an orbiting body that periodically emits clouds of dust that occult the star"
V1400 Centauri	K5 IV(e) Li	12.31	—	14^{h} 07^{m} 47.93^{s}	−39° 45′ 42.7″	434	Eclipse by a free-floating brown dwarf or rogue planet with a circumstellar disk or ring system
VVV-WIT-07	—	14.35–16.164	—	17^{h} 26^{m} 29.387^{s}	−35° 40′ 6.20″	23000/?	Unknown
WD 1145+017 (EPIC 201563164)	DB	17.0	—	11^{h} 48^{m} 33.63^{s}	+01° 28′ 59.4″	570	Dust disk
ZTF J0139+5245 (ZTF J013906.17+524536.89)	DA	18.4	—	01^{h} 39^{m} 06.17^{s}	+52° 45′ 36.89″	564	Dust disk
Gaia17bpp	M0-III	16.13–20.48	—	19^{h} 37^{m} 23.16^{s}	+17° 59′ 02.90″	27,600	Dust disk
Gaia21bcv	K4.5V	17.70–20.12	3.2	07^{h} 14^{m} 33.276^{s}	−12° 13′ 27.34″	4,508	Eclipse by a substellar companion with a 0.5 AU-radius debris disk
ASASSN-21js	B (Note: ASASSN-21js's temperature of 14800+4200 −2800 K lies within the temperature range for B-type main-sequence stars.)	12.8	1.38	11^{h} 47^{m} 11.754^{s}	−62° 10′ 36.80″	9,149	Eclipse by a distant substellar companion with a 1.05 AU-radius debris disk
WD 1054–226	DAZ	16.0	—	10^{h} 56^{m} 38.63^{s}	−22° 52′ 56.08″	118	Debris disc
Main-Sequence Dippers	FGK V	13.5 - 18.5	—	—	—	330 - 43,000	Unknown

== See also ==
- BD+20°307
- Disrupted planet
- Ecliptic Plane Input Catalog (EPIC)
- Gaia16aye
- List of transiting circumsecondary disks
- Lists of astronomical objects
- List of semiregular variable stars
- Lists of stars
- List of variable stars
- Search for extraterrestrial intelligence
- WD 0145+234 (star disrupting an exoasteroid)
