= Gaia16aye =

Microlensing event

- Event type: Gravitational microlensing event
- Date: 9 August 2016
- Instrument: Gaia
- Constellation: Cygnus
- Distance: 780 parsecs (lensing system)
- Source: 2MASS 19400112+3007533 (lensed star)
- Peak apparent magnitude: 14.5 (lensed star)

Gaia16aye is a gravitational microlensing event of the star 2MASS 19400112+3007533 (the source star) by a dimmer binary star system (the lens star system). The source star 2MASS 19400112+3007533 is a magnitude 14.5 (Gaia RP) star in Cygnus. It was closely observed during a set of brightening events caused by gravitational microlensing in 2016. The Gaia16aye event was first noticed by the Gaia space mission via an alert on August 9, 2016. The unusual characteristics of the event led to an immediate massive follow-up campaign by tens of professional and amateur observers over the next 500 days, during which 5 brightening events were closely observed. The star brightened up to two and a half magnitudes in each microlensing event over its baseline brightness.

The brightenings were determined to have been caused by a dim binary star system much closer to the Earth, acting as a moving, changing gravitational lens. The light of the lens star system itself was lost in the glare of the brighter star 2MASS 19400112+3007533. The lens star system is predicted to be observable in 2021 after its proper motion has created a separation of about 50 mas from the brighter background star. Detailed observations and analytical modelling determined that the lens system consists of two main sequence stars with Solar masses 0.57 ± 0.05 and 0.36 ± 0.03, at a distance of 780 pc (2,500 ly), and an orbital period of 2.88 years.

The space-time geometry of a binary star system is complicated, which leads to sudden jumps in brightness as the caustics of the lens cross by the light rays from the lensed source. Furthermore, the relative motions of the binary lens stars and the source star interacted with each other:

The rotation was fast enough and the overall micro-lensing event slow enough that the background star entered the high magnification region, left it and then entered it again

— Lukasz Wyrzykowski, Global Gaia campaign reveals secrets of stellar pair

== See also ==
- List of stars that have unusual dimming periods
