= ASASSN-24fw =

Star with unusual dimming event

Observation data Epoch J2000.0 Equinox J2000.0
- Constellation: Monoceros
- Right ascension: 07^{h} 51^{m} 41.996^{s}
- Declination: +09° 23′ 9.79″

Characteristics
- Evolutionary stage: Main-sequence
- Spectral type: F8IV

Astrometry
Radial velocity (R_{v})	36.87 km/s
Proper motion (μ)	RA: -3.75 mas/yr Dec.: -7.612 mas/yr
Distance	3,260 ly

Details
Mass	1.40+0.07 −0.11 M_{☉}
Radius	1.95+0.05 −0.06 R_{☉}
Age	2.75 ± 0.24 Gyr

Other designations
- ASASSN-24fw, 2MASS J07051897+0612195, WISE J070518.97+061219.5, UCAC4 482-031200, Gaia DR3 3152916838954800512

Database references
SIMBAD	data

ASASSN-24fw is a F-type main-sequence star that underwent a rare, prolonged occultation event detected by the All Sky Automated Survey for SuperNovae (ASAS-SN), resulting in a deep dimming of approximately 4.1 magnitudes in the g-band lasting about 8–9 months from late September 2024 to late May or June 2025.

== Observation ==
The star is located approximately 3,260 light-years away in the constellation of Monoceros. It has an estimated mass of about 1.4 M_{☉} and exhibits an infrared excess indicative of circumstellar dust, with pre-event photometry showing stability over more than a decade of ASAS-SN monitoring.

One model attributes the occultation to optically thick rings or a circumplanetary disk surrounding either a red dwarf or a substellar companion (brown dwarf or massive gas giant, minimum mass around 3–3.4 M_{J}), with ring radius ~0.17 AU forming a large structure at ~14 AU orbital separation.

The ASASSN-24fw planetary system
Companion (in order from star)	Mass	Semimajor axis (AU)	Orbital period (years)	Eccentricity	Inclination (°)	Radius
Ab (unconfirmed)	3.4 M_{J}	14.0	16060.0	0.88±0.07	—	—

== See also ==
- List of stars that have unusual dimming periods
