= Infrared excess =

Measurement of an astronomical source

An infrared excess (also known as an IR excess, or IRX) is a measurement of an astronomical source, typically a star, which has a greater than expected infrared flux in the spectral energy distribution assuming that the source is a blackbody radiator. Infrared excesses in stars are often the result of circumstellar dust grains heated by incident starlight causing re-emission at longer wavelengths, and they are common in young stellar objects, evolved asymptotic branch stars, and white dwarfs. Infrared excesses have also been found during observations of other objects such as active galactic nuclei and black holes.

== Theory ==
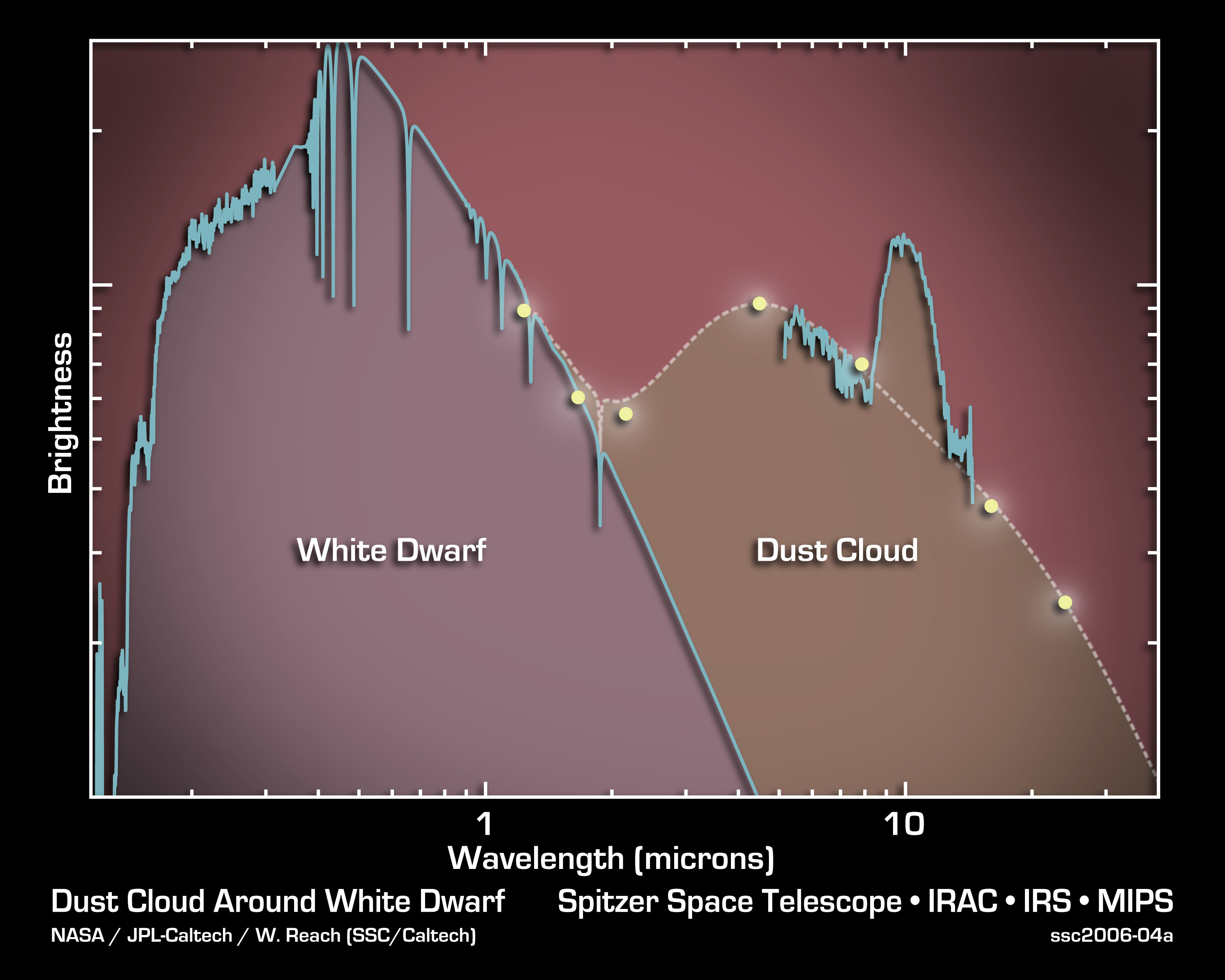
Infrared excess in the spectral energy distribution of dust-enshrouded white dwarf G29-38.

Many astronomical sources like stars can be assumed to act like black body radiators, where the shape of their spectrum is expected to follow Planck's law as a function of stellar temperature. This blackbody approximation is often coarse, however, as objects also have features like spectral lines caused by molecular absorption and emission. Infrared excesses are one such feature caused by an increased infrared flux generally around wavelengths of 2.5 μm. The existence of infrared excess in an object's spectrum often implies a more complex physical structure than a single source, and may indicate dusty surroundings, though this varies based on the nature of the source.

The shape of the infrared excess within an object's spectrum can also be used to infer properties about the surrounding dust and gas. Although infrared excesses are often also approximated as blackbodies (where two blackbody curves are fit to a spectrum to determine the temperature of the star and the surrounding dust), the shapes of these excesses depend inherently on the size, temperature, and composition of the dust grains. The prominence of these infrared excesses also depend on the orientation of the surrounding dust and gas, the system inclination, and the opacity or optical depth of the surrounding material.

Infrared excesses are often identified in the spectral energy distributions (SED) of objects detected via astronomical spectroscopy. As a result, spectral features like absorption or emission lines can provide insight into the composition of surrounding material. These spectral energy distributions also notably evolve over the lifetime of the circumstellar material, and vary over long (generally not observable) timescales. Changes in properties of the surrounding gas and dust may also lead to varying observational characteristics, if for example circumstellar dust is being cleared by engulfment or Poynting-Robertson drag.

== Observation ==
Infrared excesses are observed around a large number of astronomical objects including stars (during almost all phases of stellar evolution), stellar remnants, and black holes.

=== In stars ===
Infrared excesses are visible in the spectra of young stars with debris disks, like T Tauri and Herbig Ae/Be stars. In T Tauri stars, forming protostars still accreting material below three solar masses, infrared excesses may be correlated with excesses in the optical range, indicating a relationship between disk mass and accretion rate. IR excesses in T Tauri stars may also be indicative of disk structure if multiple blackbody curves are seen throughout the infrared. These gaps or holes are likely the result of gravitational disruption due to planet formation. Herbig Ae stars similarly display significant infrared excesses up to approximately seven solar masses, whereas Herbig Be stars at larger masses have smaller IR excesses as a result of more intense stellar winds driving rapid dust dispersal.

Main sequence stars also have infrared excesses, though the prevalence of infrared excesses are expected to decrease over stellar lifetimes due to disk evolution. Main sequence infrared excesses likely result from dispersing protoplanetary disks or collisions between exoplanets. Exoplanet collisions may notably brighten these stars in the infrared on short timescales. Though less likely, main sequence infrared excesses could also result from extraterrestrial technosignatures such as Dyson swarms.

Many AGB stars and post-AGB stars possess infrared excesses as a result of stellar wind-driven mass loss. The intense mass loss these stars experience often leads to the formation of circumstellar envelopes, which produce IR excesses and may have unique spectral lines as a result of the s-process driving the synthesis of heavy elements. These circumstellar envelopes produce an IR excess as they evolve, however this decreases over time as the resulting planetary nebula disperses.

=== In stellar remnants ===
IR excesses have also been observed during observations of white dwarfs. These infrared excesses likely result from residual extrasolar planets or debris tidally disrupted by the star, however they may also be indicative of substellar companions. Dust around white dwarfs which would otherwise be cleared by stellar evolution is generally attributed to tidal disruption, orbital perturbations, exoplanet collisions, and comet replenishment. Approximately 5-9% of white dwarfs display infrared excesses, often resulting from flat and optically thick dust disks, while a smaller percentage likely have IR excesses from brown dwarf and M dwarf companions. Generally IR excesses in white dwarfs may indicate white dwarf pollution, which can be spectroscopically confirmed via atmospheric observations, but many polluted white dwarfs do not display an infrared excess. This may be the result of a variety of causes, notably that dust disks may be optically thick but narrow, evading detection, and that many disks may also be optically thin. On long timescales, even once the IR excess becomes undetectable, white dwarfs may still show evidence of pollution.

Active galactic nuclei also display infrared excesses. When correcting for the effects of dust in AGN observations, the IRX-$\beta$ relation is often used, a metric comparing the infrared excess (IRX) and ultraviolet continuum slope. In local starburst galaxies, the IRX-$\beta$ relation is monotonic, however in non-starburst galaxies the relationship is more scattered. The IRX-$\beta$ relation is also likely correlated with galactic metallicity.

=== Luminous infrared galaxies ===
Large IR excesses are also known to be present in luminous infrared galaxies (LIRGs). IRXs in these objects are generally a result of mergers between spiral galaxies driving intense starburst activity. AGN also play an important role in LIRG activity, especially at extremely high luminosities. Even brighter ultra luminous infrared galaxies (ULIRGs) may reach luminosities greater than 10^{1}^{2} L_{☉} as a result of AGN and starburst activity.

== See also ==
- Circumstellar disc
- Circumstellar dust
- Circumstellar envelope
- Debris disk
- White dwarf
- Young stellar object
