= EPIC 204278916 =

Pre-main-sequence star

Observation data Epoch J2000.0 Equinox ICRS
- Constellation: Scorpius
- Right ascension: 16^{h} 02^{m} 07.577^{s}
- Declination: −22° 57′ 46.88″
- Apparent magnitude (V): 14.8

Characteristics
- Evolutionary stage: Pre-main-sequence
- Spectral type: M1
- Apparent magnitude (R): 13.7
- Apparent magnitude (G): 13.68
- J−H color index: 0.712
- J−K color index: 1.033

Astrometry
Proper motion (μ)	RA: −12.1±0.024 mas/yr Dec.: −25.029±0.015 mas/yr
Parallax (π)	7.1084±0.0198 mas
Distance	459 ± 1 ly (140.7 ± 0.4 pc)

Details
Mass	0.5 M_{☉}
Radius	0.97 R_{☉}
Luminosity (bolometric)	0.15 L_{☉}
Temperature	3,673 K
Age	≈5 Myr

Other designations
- 2MASS J16020757-2257467, UCAC2 22721863, USNO-B1.0 0670-00406583, Gaia DR2 6243130106031671168, Gaia DR3 6243130106031671168

Database references
SIMBAD	data

EPIC 204278916 is a pre-main-sequence star, about five million years old with a spectral type of M1, implying a red dwarf. It is part of the Upper Scorpius sub-group of the Scorpius–Centaurus association, and is in the constellation Scorpius. The star is approximately the size of the Sun at 0.97 R_{☉}, but is only half its mass (0.50 M_{☉}) and a fraction of its luminosity (0.15 L_{☉}).

This stellar object was first characterized by the 2nd USNO CCD Astrograph Catalog and the Two Micron All-Sky Survey, and was further studied during the Kepler space telescope's extended K2 mission Campaign 2 between 23 August and 13 November 2014.

== Luminosity ==
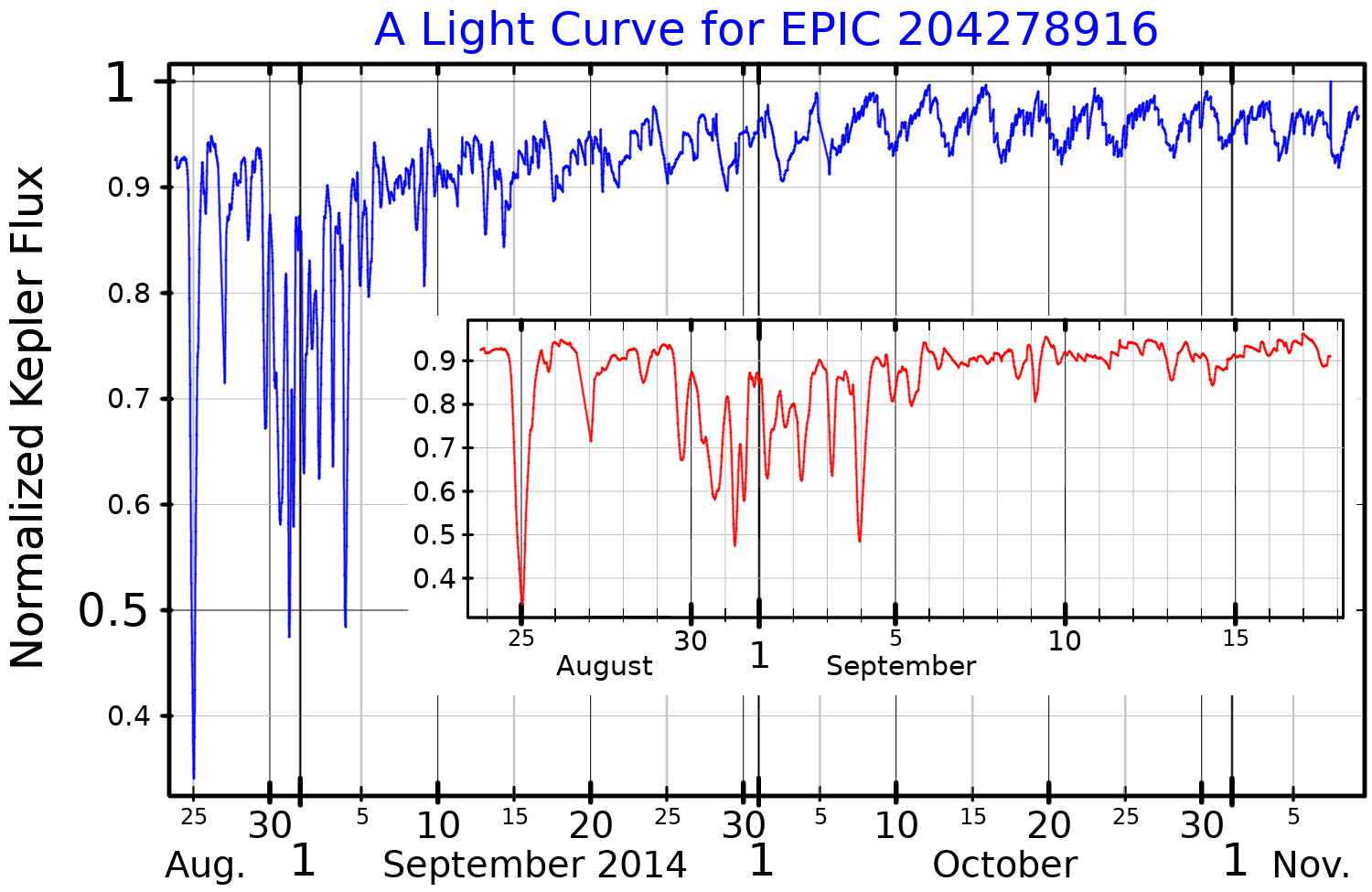
A light curve for EPIC 204278916, adapted from Scaringi et al. (2016). The inset plot shows the first 25 days of the data shown in the main plot.

In August 2016, a team of astronomers, led by Simone Scaringi of the Max Planck Institute for Extraterrestrial Physics in Germany, reported that this red dwarf star has a resolved circumstellar disc. Further, the research team observed unusual luminosity dimmings of up to 65% for 25 consecutive days (out of 79 total observation days). The variability in luminosity was highly periodic and attributed to stellar rotation. The researchers hypothesized that the irregular dimmings were caused by either a warped inner-disk edge or transiting cometary-like objects in either circular or eccentric orbits.

== See also ==
- Disrupted planet
- List of stars that have unusual dimming periods
