= Vista Variables in the Via Lactea =

The Lobster Nebula seen with ESO's VISTA telescope, as a part of the VVV survey.

VISTA Variables in the Via Lactea –The VVV Survey– is observing the Milky Way's bulge and southern disk in the near-infrared using the capabilities of the VISTA Telescope at Paranal, Chile.

The survey started in February 2010 and was completed in 2016. On 2015 the VVV Science Team applied to the second cycle of Public Surveys for VISTA as the VVV eXtended Survey –VVVX– and started observing the second semester of 2016, to be completed by 2020.

== Goals ==
The VVV Survey is a public infrared (IR) variability survey of the Milky Way bulge and an adjacent section of the mid-plane where star formation activity is high. To complete this survey it will take 1929 hours, covering 10^{9} stars within an area of 520 square degrees, including 33 known globular clusters and around 350 open clusters. The final products will be: a deep IR atlas in 5 passbands and a catalogue of 10^{6} variable stars. These will produce a 3-D map of the surveyed region (unlike single-epoch surveys that only give 2-D maps) using well-understood primary distance indicators such as RR Lyrae stars. It will yield important information on the ages of the stellar populations.

The observations will be combined with data from MACHO, OGLE, EROS, VST, SPITZER, HST, CHANDRA, INTEGRAL, and ALMA for a complete understanding of the variable sources in the inner Milky Way. Several important implications for the history of the Milky Way, for globular cluster evolution, for the population census of the bulge and center, and for pulsation theory would follow from this survey.

== See also ==
- VVV-WIT-07
