= V773 Tauri =

Star system in the constellation Taurus

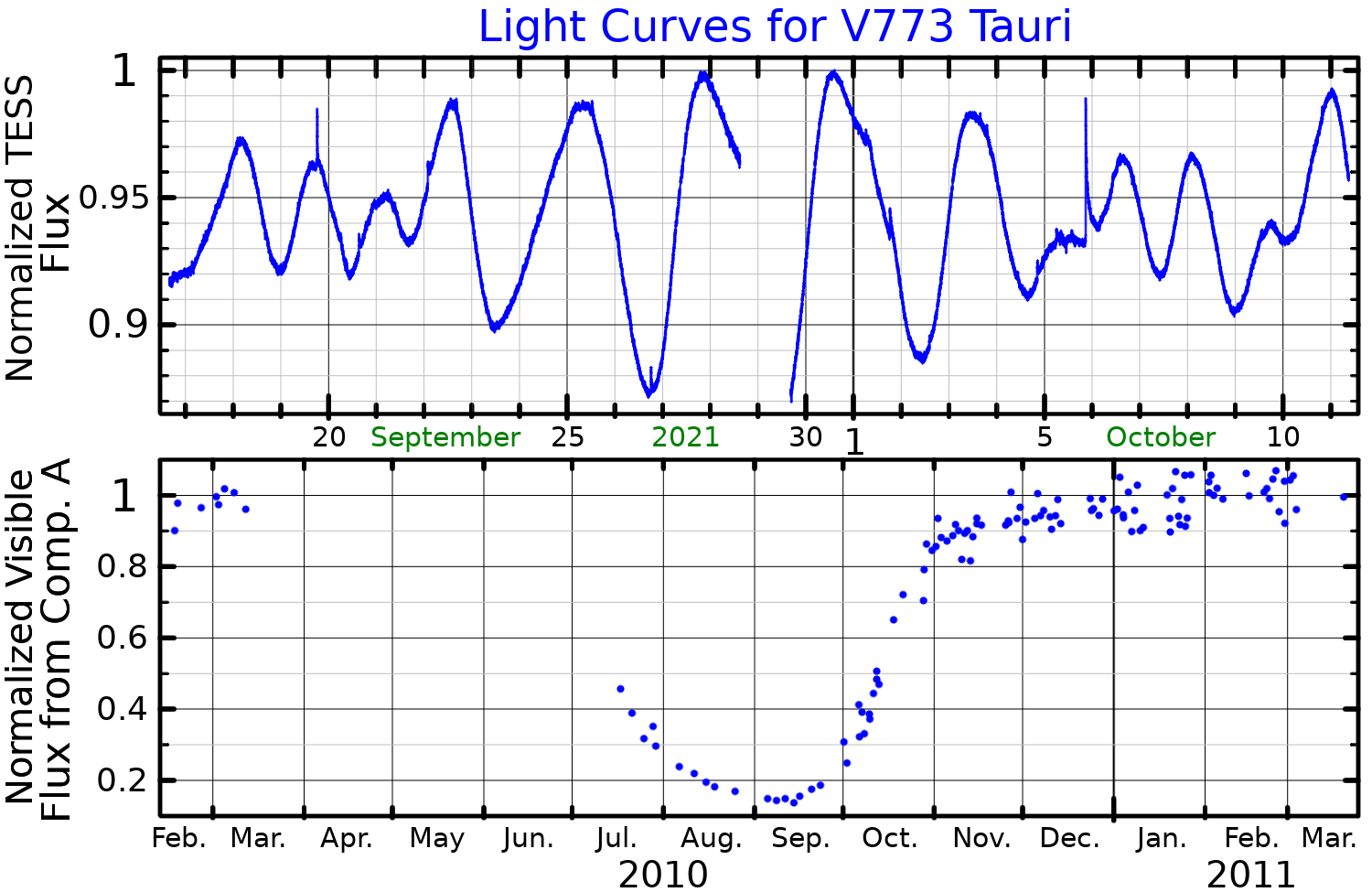
- Light curves for V773 Tauri. The upper panel shows the variability as seen by TESS. The lower panel, adapted from Kenworthy et al., shows the eclipse seen in 2010.

Observation data Epoch J2000 Equinox J2000
- Constellation: Taurus
- Right ascension: 04^{h} 14^{m} 12.926^{s}
- Declination: +28° 12′ 12.36″
- Apparent magnitude (V): 10.59 to 10.95

Characteristics
- Spectral type: K3Ve (Li)
- Variable type: Orion variable + BY Dra

Astrometry
Proper motion (μ)	RA: 6.540 mas/yr Dec.: −27.792 mas/yr
Parallax (π)	8.3261±0.1313 mas
Distance	433.1 ± 7.5 ly (132.8±2.3 pc)

Orbit
Primary	V773 Tau AB
Name	V773 Tau C
Period (P)	624+83 −52 yr
Semi-major axis (a)	1,013+93 −74 mas
Eccentricity (e)	0.40+0.04 −0.05
Inclination (i)	97.3±0.6°
Longitude of the node (Ω)	104.6±1.3°
Periastron epoch (T)	1,740+26 −40
Argument of periastron (ω) (secondary)	107.8±4.5°

Orbit
Primary	V773 Tau A
Name	V773 Tau B
Period (P)	26.50±0.07 yr
Semi-major axis (a)	117.7±0.86 mas
Eccentricity (e)	0.104±0.009
Inclination (i)	69.25±0.40°
Longitude of the node (Ω)	290.54±0.40°
Periastron epoch (T)	2,010.11±0.12
Argument of periastron (ω) (secondary)	266.0±1.5°
Semi-amplitude (K_{1}) (primary)	6.50±0.50 km/s

Orbit
Primary	V773 Tau Aa
Name	V773 Tau Ab
Period (P)	51.1033±0.0018 d
Semi-major axis (a)	2.809±0.033 mas
Eccentricity (e)	0.2713±0.0066
Inclination (i)	68.5±1.6°
Longitude of the node (Ω)	62.4±1.1°
Periastron epoch (T)	53,059.75±0.28 MJD
Argument of periastron (ω) (secondary)	5.6±2.2°
Semi-amplitude (K_{1}) (primary)	35.72±0.46 km/s
Semi-amplitude (K_{2}) (secondary)	42.9±1.3 km/s

Details

Aa
Mass	1.55±0.11 M_{☉}
Radius	2.22 R_{☉}
Luminosity	2.56 L_{☉}
Surface gravity (log g)	3.93 cgs
Temperature	4,900 K
Age	3±1 Myr

Ab
Mass	1.293±0.068 M_{☉}
Radius	1.74 R_{☉}
Luminosity	1.37 L_{☉}
Surface gravity (log g)	4.08 cgs
Temperature	4,740 K

Other designations
- V773 Tau, HD 283447, HIP 19762, WDS J04142+2813A

Database references
SIMBAD	data

V773 Tauri is a young, multiple star system in the central region of Taurus, an equatorial constellation. This is a T Tauri-type variable star that ranges in apparent visual magnitude from 10.59 down to 10.95, which is too faint to be viewed with the naked eye. Based on various estimates, the system is located at a distance of approximately 433 light years from the Sun. It lies near the dark cloud Lynds 1495.

Aa
Period = 51.1 d
Ab
Period = 26.5 yr
B(ab)
Period = 624 yr
C

Hierarchy of orbits

This system was identified as a T Tauri star by A. E. Rydgren and associates in 1974. Radio emission was detected from this source in 1983. In 1993, it was discovered to be a double star with an angular separation of about 150 mas: the two components are designated A and B. Component A was found to be a double-lined spectroscopic binary with an orbital period of 51 days. In 2003, a third member of this group was located, component C, at a separation of 256 mas from component A.

Orbital solutions for the A–B pair provide an unexpectedly high dynamic mass of 2.69±0.67 M_{☉} for component B, suggesting it too may be a binary system. A single star with that much mass would have 17 times the luminosity of the Sun, which is inconsistent with the observed optical luminosity. Photometry of component B suggests it is experiencing extinction from dust along the line of sight. The component is variable in the K band, which is consistent with clumps or clouds of dust in orbit.

In 2010, an extended eclipse was observed in the V773 Tauri system. This was interpreted as a circumbinary disk of component B passing in front of component A. The eclipse obscured 70% of the emission from component A and lasted 150 days.
