= Circumstellar envelope =

Part of a star

A circumstellar envelope (CSE) is a part of a star that has a roughly spherical shape and is not gravitationally bound to the star core. Usually circumstellar envelopes are formed from the dense stellar wind, or they are present before the formation of the star. Circumstellar envelopes of old stars (Mira variables and OH/IR stars) eventually evolve into protoplanetary nebulae, and circumstellar envelopes of young stellar objects evolve into circumstellar discs.

== Types of circumstellar envelopes ==
- Circumstellar envelopes of AGB stars
- Circumstellar envelopes around young stellar objects

== See also ==
- Circumstellar dust
- Common envelopes
- Stellar evolution
