= VVV-WIT-07 =

Star noted for unusual dimming events

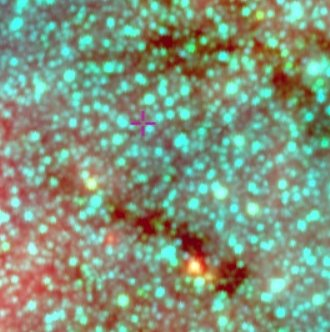
- Context star field of VVV-WIT-07

Observation data Epoch J2000 Equinox ICRS
- Constellation: Scorpius
- Right ascension: 17^{h} 26^{m} 29.387^{s}
- Declination: −35° 40′ 56.20″

Astrometry
Proper motion (μ)	RA: 2.469 mas/yr Dec.: 1.374 mas/yr
Parallax (π)	2.5190±1.1187 mas
Distance	approx. 1,300 ly (approx. 400 pc)

Other designations
- Gaia DR2 5974962995291907584

Database references
SIMBAD	data

VVV-WIT-07 is a unique variable star which presents a sequence of recurrent dimmings (K_{s}~14.35 – 16.164) with a possible deep eclipse in July 2012. The star, located in the constellation Scorpius about 23,000 ly (7,100 pc) away, is not a binary star, which would eliminate such a system from explaining the various observed dimmings.

== Overview ==
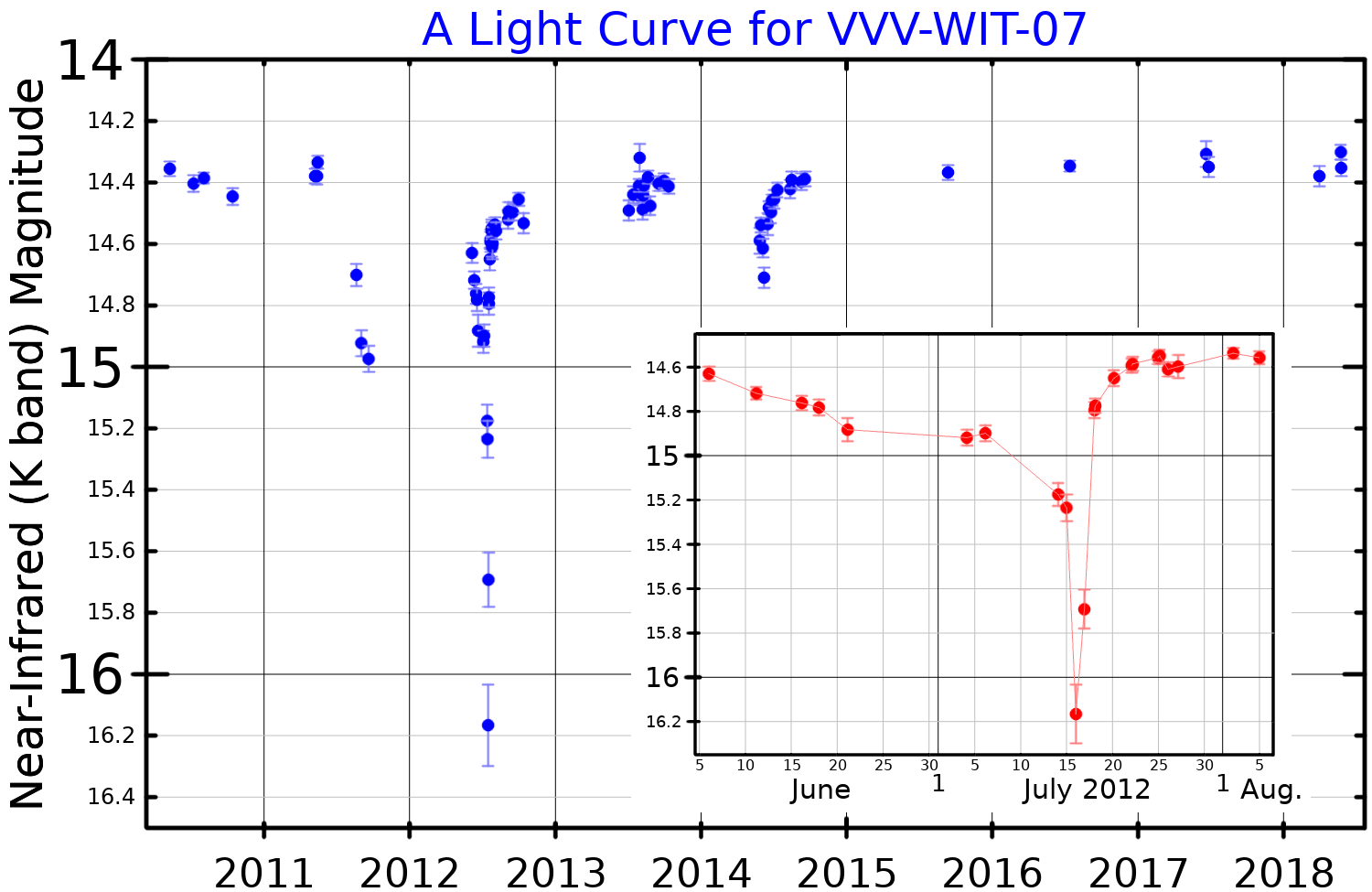
A light curve for VVV-WIT-07, adapted from Saito et al. (2019). The inset plot shows the July 2012 dimming event with an expanded scale.

The star was found by the "Vista Variables in the Via Lactea" (VVV) project, which is a survey of European Southern Observatory (ESO) variability of the innermost bulge of the Milky Way galaxy. The near-infrared spectra of VVV-WIT-07 appear without features, without prominent emission or absorption lines. The characteristics found in the light curve of VVV-WIT-07 (WIT refers to "What Is This?") are similar to those seen in J1407 (Mamajek's Object), a pre-MS K5 dwarf with a ring system that eclipses the star or, alternatively, to Tabby's star, an F3 IV/V star that shows irregular and aperiodic obscurations in its light curve.

From 2010 to 2018, the star dimmed and brightened irregularly (v~14.35 – 16.164), and seemed similar to Tabby's star, except the light from VVV-WIT-07 dimmed by up to 80 percent, while Tabby's star faded by only about 20 percent. Another star, J1407, however, has been found to have dimmed by up to 95%, which may be more similar to the light curve presented by VVV-WIT-07. Nonetheless, according to ESO astronomer Valentin Ivanov, "A key word that could be used to describe our finding [of VVV-WIT-07] is extreme. In every aspect ... We have identified a system that challenges the imagination even more than usual, because it is so unlike our own planetary system."

== See also ==
- Disrupted planet
- List of stars that have unusual dimming periods
