= PDS 110 =

Pre-main-sequence star

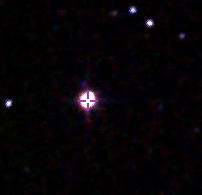
- PDS 110; Credit: Two Micron All Sky Survey (2MASS)

Observation data Epoch J2000.0 Equinox J2000.0
- Constellation: Orion
- Right ascension: 05^{h} 23^{m} 31.01018^{s}
- Declination: −01° 04′ 23.7016″
- Apparent magnitude (V): 10.4

Characteristics
- Evolutionary stage: pre-main sequence
- Spectral type: keF6IVeb
- Variable type: UX Ori?

Astrometry
Radial velocity (R_{v})	27.97±2.55 km/s
Proper motion (μ)	RA: +1.503(19) mas/yr Dec.: −0.388(12) mas/yr
Parallax (π)	2.8857±0.0212 mas
Distance	1,130 ± 8 ly (347 ± 3 pc)
Absolute magnitude (M_{V})	+2.54

Details
Mass	3.0 M_{☉}
Radius	2.23 R_{☉}
Luminosity (bolometric)	7.76 L_{☉}
Surface gravity (log g)	3.8 cgs
Temperature	6,653 K
Metallicity [Fe/H]	+0.06 dex
Age	10 Myr

Other designations
- HD 290380, IRAS 05209−0107, GLMP 91, 2MASS J05233100−0104237, TYC 4753-1534-1

Database references
SIMBAD	data

PDS 110 is a young 11th magnitude star located approximately 1,130 light-years (350 parsecs) away in the constellation Orion. A series of eclipses was observed in 2008 and 2011, which may have been caused by dust from the star's circumstellar disk.

== Description ==
PDS 110 is a young star still approaching the main sequence. It has been classified as a T Tauri star, or as a pre-main sequence star. The emission lines indicative of a T Tauri classification are somewhat weaker than a typical T Tauri star, interpreted as a post-T Tauri stage.

PDS 110 hosts a circumstellar disk.

== 2008-2011 eclipses ==
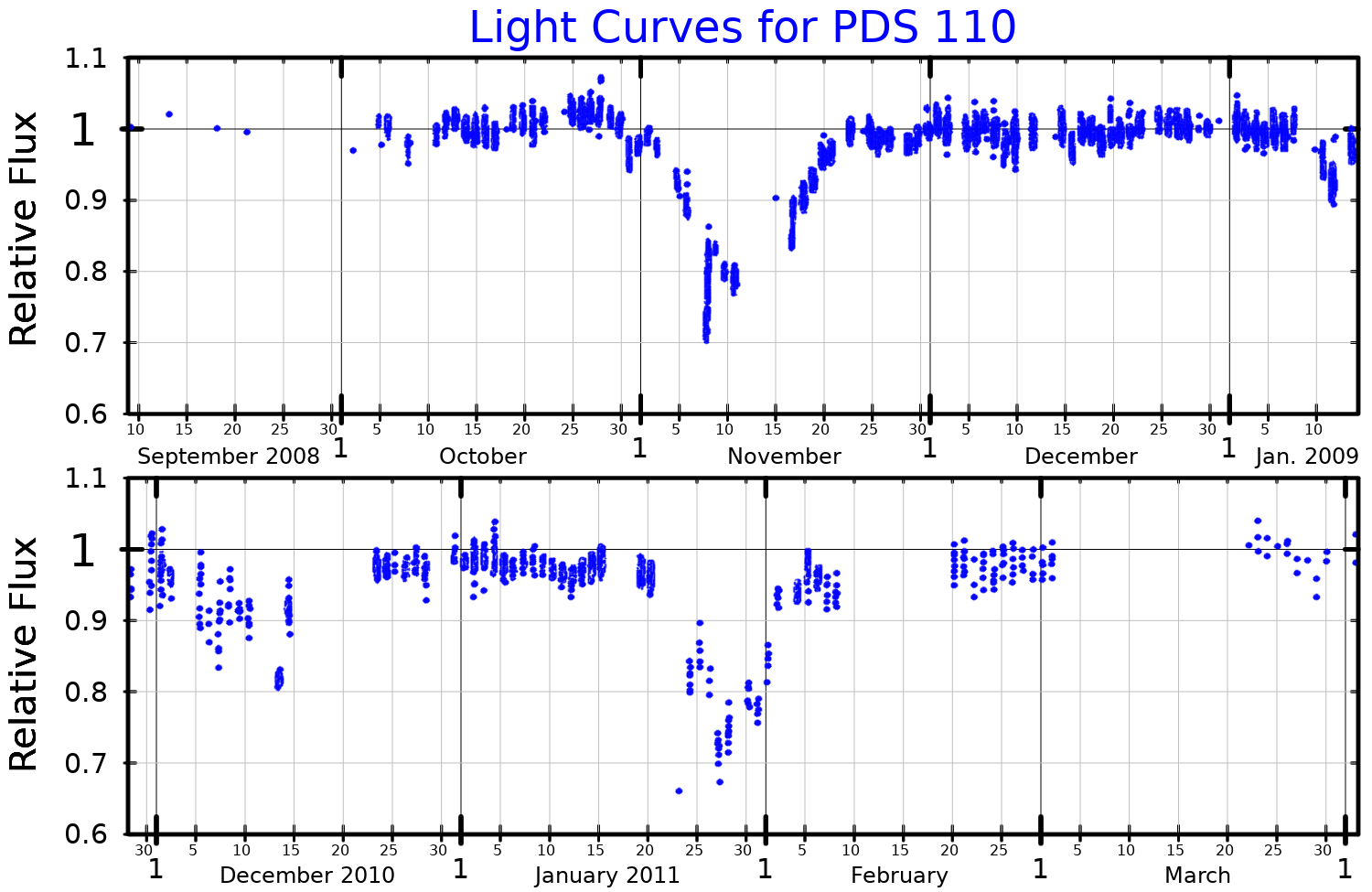
light curves for PDS 110 showing the 2008 and 2011 eclipses, adapted from Osborn et al. (2017)

Brightness measurements from SuperWASP and KELT showed two similar reductions in brightness in November 2008 and January 2011, both with a maximal luminosity reduction of 30% and a duration of 25 days. These events were interpreted as transits of a structure with a period of 808 ± 2 days, corresponding to an orbital distance of about 2 AU. The large reduction in brightness could have happened due to a planet or brown dwarf with a circum-secondary disk of dust with a radius of 0.3 AU around a central object with a mass between 1.8 and 70 times the mass of Jupiter.

Another transit was predicted for September 2017, but nothing similar to the previous events was seen, ruling out a periodic event. A search of 50 years of archival data also did not find any similar eclipses. The eclipses may have been caused by dust around PDS 110 itself. Larger-scale aperiodic dimmings have been observed as UX Orionis variables, and PDS 110 may be similar.

An independent 2021 study, assuming that the eclipses were caused by a ringed object in orbit around the star, attempted to constrain the properties of such an object, with their preferred solution being a >35 M_{J} brown dwarf on a nearly circular orbit. However, this does not explain the fact that no eclipse was observed in 2017.

== See also ==
- Disrupted planet
- List of stars that have unusual dimming periods
