= EPIC 204376071 =

Star noted for unusual dimming events

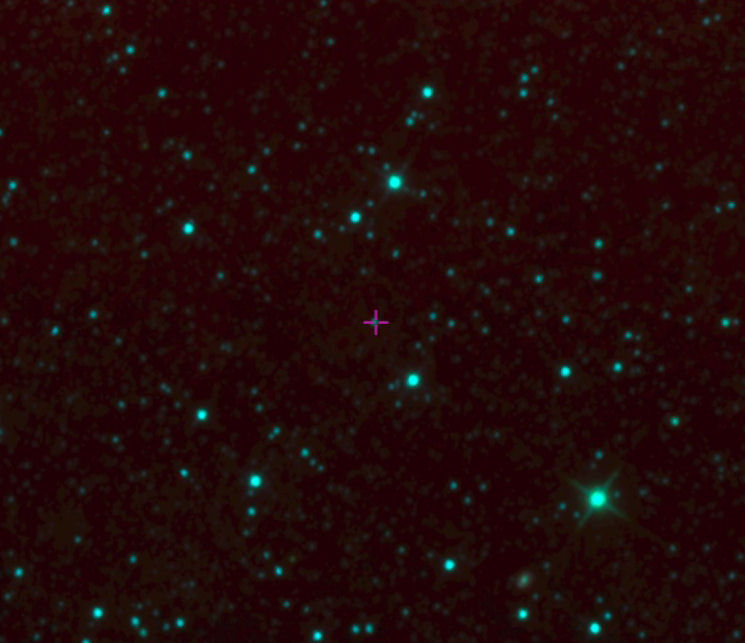
- Context star field of EPIC 204376071

Observation data Epoch J2000.0 (ICRS) Equinox ICRS
- Constellation: Scorpius
- Right ascension: 16^{h} 04^{m} 10.1267^{s}
- Declination: −22° 34′ 45.550″
- Apparent magnitude (V): 18.0

Characteristics
- Evolutionary stage: M

Astrometry
| Proper motion (μ) | RA: −11.544 mas/yr Dec.: −24.892 mas/yr |
| Parallax (π) | 7.3908±0.1944 mas |
| Distance | 440 ± 10 ly (135 ± 4 pc) |

Details
| Mass | 0.161±0.028 M_{☉} |
| Radius | 0.631±0.042 R_{☉} |
| Luminosity (bolometric) | 0.0273±0.0020 L_{☉} |
| Temperature | 2960±75 K |
| Rotation | 1.63 days |
| Age | 10 Myr |

Other designations
- UScoCTIO 48, 2MASS J16041012-2234453

Database references
| SIMBAD | data |

EPIC 204376071 is an M-type star in the constellation of Scorpius. Parallax measurements by the Gaia space observatory put the star at a distance of about 440 light-years (130 parsecs) from Earth. It is likely a member of the Upper Sco association, and is young enough that it has not yet become a main-sequence star.

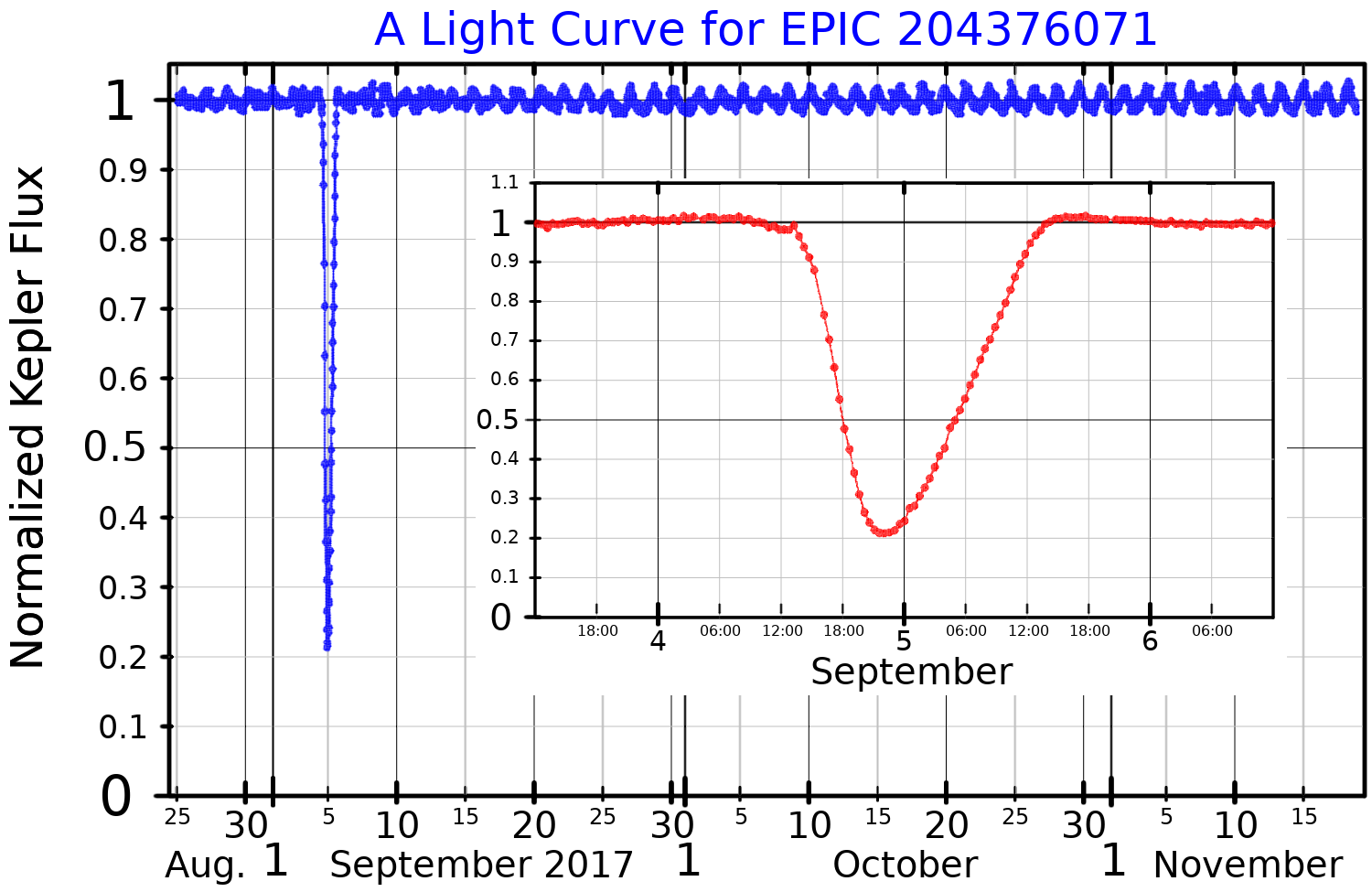
A light curve for EPIC 204376071, adapted from Rappaport et al. (2019). The inset plot shows the time around the dimming with an expanded scale.

Unusual light fluctuations of the star, including up to an 80% dimming in brightness (i.e., "single 80% deep occultation of 1-day duration"), were observed by astronomers. The unusual dimming was not only extremely deep, but also substantially asymmetric, with an egress about twice as long as the ingress. Nonetheless, such an unusual dimming for EPIC 204376071 is much greater than the 22% dimming observed for Tabby's star. Several explanations have been presented to explain the unusual dimming of the EPIC 204376071 star: one, orbiting dust or small particles; or two, a "transient accretion event of dusty material near the corotation radius of the star". The unusual light curve of the star is similar to the light curve of a candidate exoplanet, KIC 10403228 b, which may have been caused by a "tilted ring system" orbiting the planet. In the case of EPIC 204376071, an orbiting brown dwarf or large planet, with a ring system, could cause a similar light curve, according to the researchers.

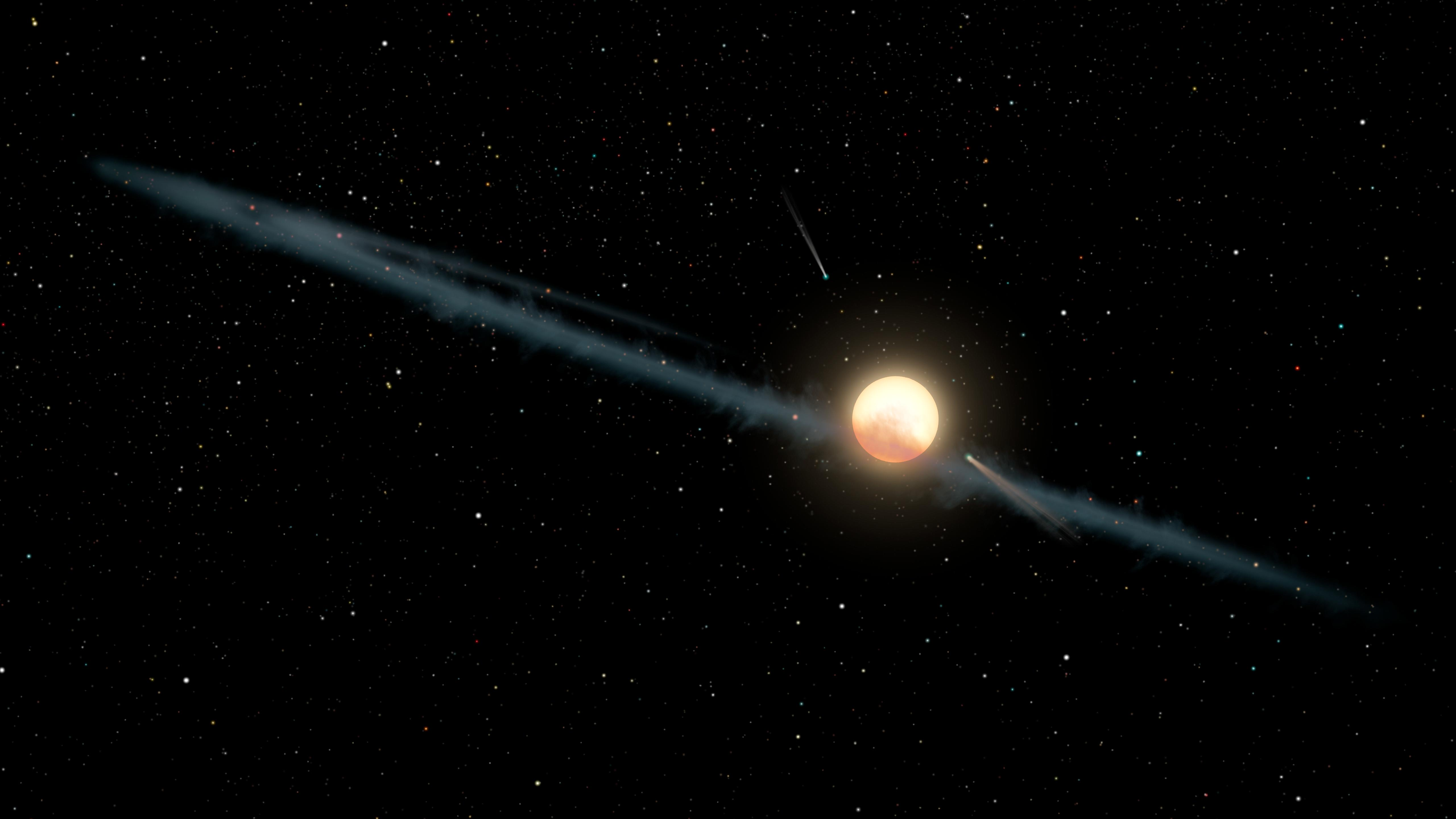
Artist's concept of dust or small particles orbiting a star.

== See also ==
- Disrupted planet
- List of stars that have unusual dimming periods
