= Circumstellar dust =

Dust around a star

Circumstellar dust is cosmic dust around a star. It can be in the form of a spherical shell or a disc, e.g. an accretion disk. Circumstellar dust can be responsible for significant extinction and is usually the source of an infrared excess for stars that have it. For some evolved stars on the asymptotic giant branch, the dust can be composed of silicate emissions. According to a study, it is still uncertain whether the dust is a result of crystalline silicate or polycyclic aromatic hydrocarbon. However, recent observations revealed that Vega-type stars display broad silicate emission. It is suggested that the circumstellar dust components can depend on the evolutionary stage of a star and is related to the changes in its physical conditions.

The study of the composition of this dust is dubbed astrominerology. The circumstellar dust around aging stars has been observed to include, "almost pure crystalline Mg-rich silicates (forsterite and clinoenstatite), amorphous silicates, diopside, spinel, oxides (corundum and Fe0.9Mg0.1O), and also carbon-rich solids such as: (hydrogenated) amorphous carbons, aromatic hydrocarbons and silicon carbide."

The motion of circumstellar dust is governed by forces due to stellar gravity and radiation pressure.

Circumstellar dust in the Solar System causes the zodiacal light.

== See also ==
- Accretion disc
- Circumplanetary disk
- Circumstellar envelope
- Tabby's Star − oddly dimming star
- List of stars that have unusual dimming periods
- WD 1145+017 - star destroying planetesimal, producing a dusty disk

== Sources ==
- J. Mayo Greenberg, H. C. Van De Hulst (17 April 2013). Interstellar Dust and Related Topics. Springer Science & Business Media, 2013. ISBN 978-9401026642.
- Hans-Peter Gail, Erwin Sedlmayr (2014). Physics and Chemistry of Circumstellar Dust Shells. Cambridge University Press, 2013. ISBN 978-0521833790.
- K. S. Krishna Swamy (2005). "Chapter 6: Circumstellar dust". Dust in the Universe: Similarities and Differences. World Scientific, 2005. ISBN 9812562931.
- Marshall Dimsey Perrin. A High Angular Resolution Survey of Circumstellar Dust Around Herbig Ae/Be Stars. University of California, Berkeley, 2006. ISBN 1109923074.
- Wilfred Henry Sorrell. A Theoretical Study of Circumstellar Dust Around Ae/Be Stars. University of Wisconsin--Madison, 1989.
