= AS Leonis Minoris =

Eclipsing binary in the constellation of Leo Minor

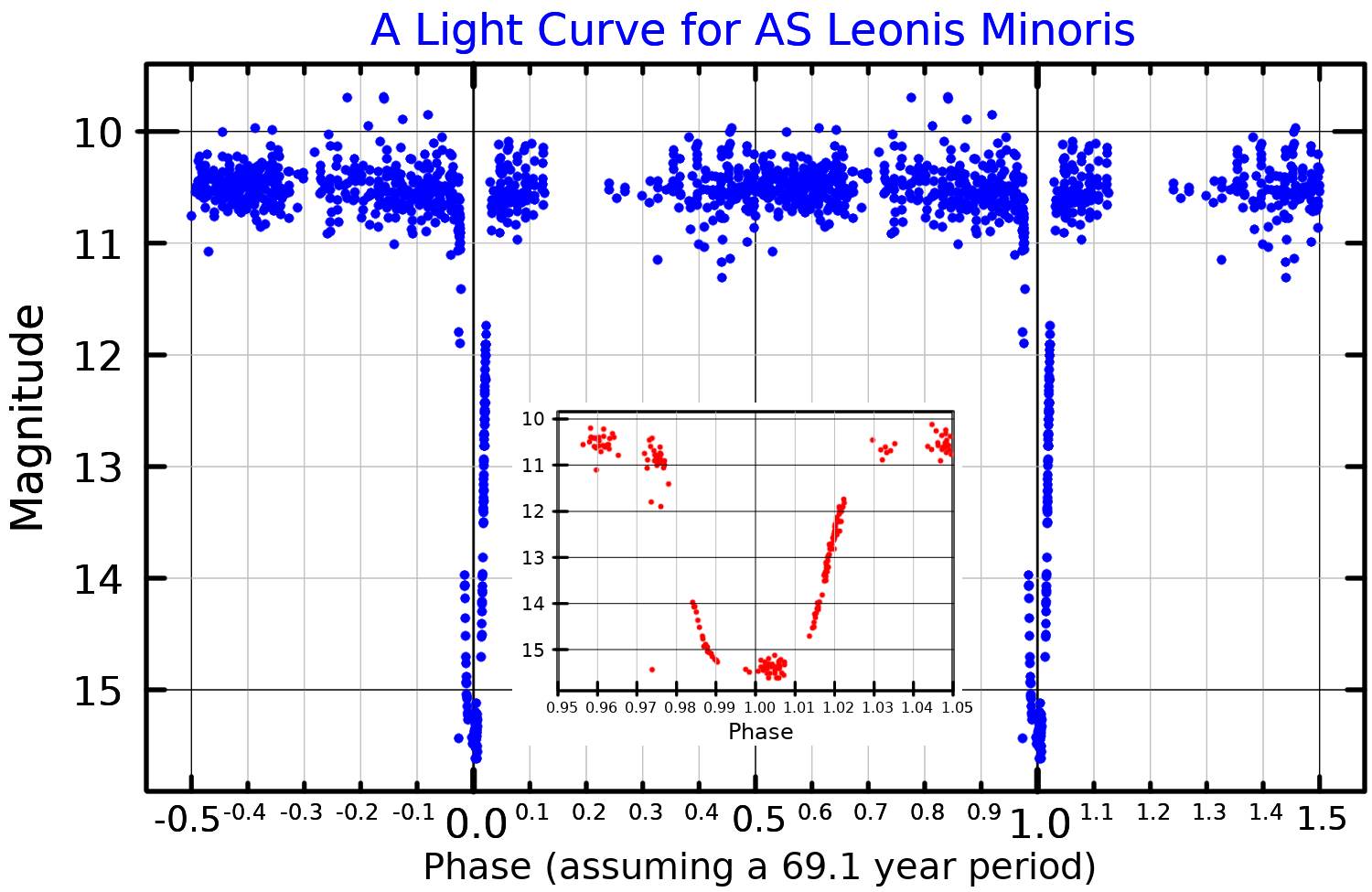
- A light curve for AS Leonis Minoris. The main plot shows the full light curve, and the inset shows the time around minimum brightness at an expanded scale. Adapted from Lipunov et al. (2016)

Observation data Epoch J2000 Equinox J2000
- Constellation: Leo Minor
- Right ascension: 09^{h} 53^{m} 10.001^{s}
- Declination: +33° 53′ 52.76″
- Apparent magnitude (V): 10.7 - 15.4

Characteristics
- Spectral type: M2.0 III
- Variable type: Algol

Astrometry
Radial velocity (R_{v})	−56.14 km/s
Proper motion (μ)	RA: 3.054±0.077 mas/yr Dec.: −11.645±0.071 mas/yr
Parallax (π)	0.6994±0.0513 mas
Distance	4,700 ± 300 ly (1,400 ± 100 pc)

Other designations
- AS LMi, TYC 2505-672-1, MASTER OT J095310.04+335352.8, IRAS F09501+3408, 2MASS J09531000+3353527

Database references
SIMBAD	data

AS Leonis Minoris (AS LMi), also known as TYC 2505-672-1, is an eclipsing binary system in the constellation of Leo Minor. It has by far the longest period, 69.1 years, of any known eclipsing binary. During its roughly 3.45 year long eclipses, it fades by 4.5 magnitudes (about a factor of 60).

AS LMi's variability was first detected in 2013, during a search for "disappearing stars" in the MASTER database. It was initially thought to be an R Coronae Borealis variable star, although its fading was unusually slow for an R Coronae Borealis variable. Because R Coronae Borealis variables fade repeatedly, the discovery of the star's dramatic brightness decline triggered a search of archival photographic plates for evidence of earlier dimming events. Tang et al. used DASCH to search the large collection of Harvard photographic plates, and found that the star had dimmed for three years during the 1940s. They recognized that AS LMi is a very long period eclipsing binary, similar to the ε Aurigae system.

The binary system consists of an M-giant primary star orbited by a small hot secondary star that is itself surrounded by an optically thick (large optical depth) disk.
