= Disrupted planet =

Planetary object disrupted by other body

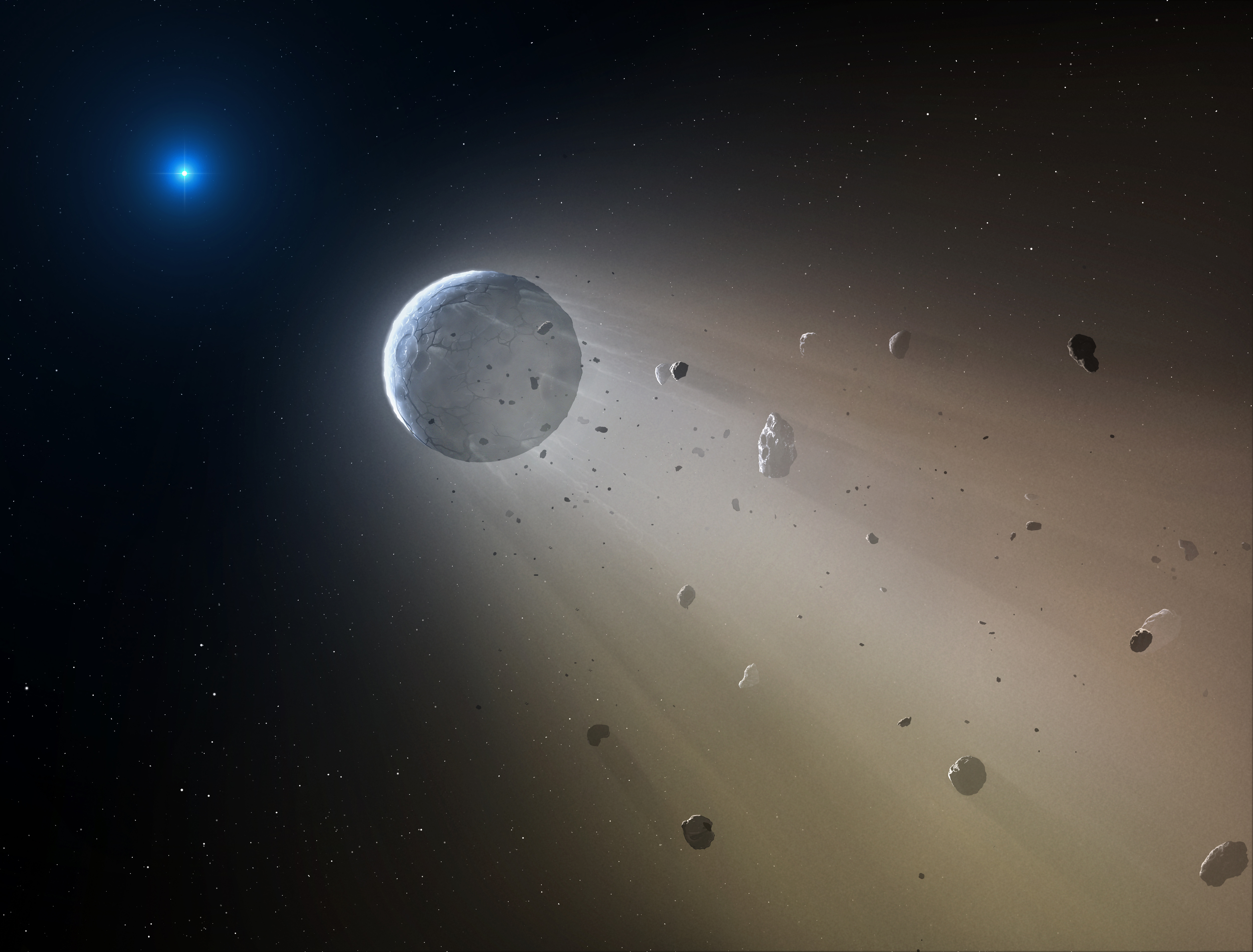
Artist concept of a rocky planetary object being vaporized by its parent star

In astronomy, a disrupted planet is a planet or exoplanet or, perhaps on a somewhat smaller scale, a planetary-mass object, planetesimal, moon, exomoon or asteroid that has been disrupted or destroyed by a nearby or passing astronomical body or object such as a star. Necroplanetology is the related study of such a process.

The result of such a disruption may be the production of excessive amounts of related gas, dust and debris, which may eventually surround the parent star in the form of a circumstellar disk or debris disk. As a consequence, the orbiting debris field may be an "uneven ring of dust", causing erratic light fluctuations in the apparent luminosity of the parent star, as may have been responsible for the oddly flickering light curves associated with the starlight observed from certain variable stars, such as that from Tabby's Star (KIC 8462852), RZ Piscium and WD 1145+017. Excessive amounts of infrared radiation may be detected from such stars, suggestive evidence in itself that dust and debris may be orbiting the stars.

== Examples ==
=== Planets ===
Examples of planets, or their related remnants, considered to have been a disrupted planet, or part of such a planet, include: ‘Oumuamua and WD 1145+017 b, as well as asteroids, hot Jupiters and those that are hypothetical planets, like Fifth planet, Phaeton, Planet V and Theia. Planets can also be disrupted by black holes; one example involves a "Jupiter-like object" being subject to a tidal disruption event by the supermassive black hole IGR J12580+0134, at the center of the galaxy NGC 4845.

=== Stars ===
Examples of parent stars considered to have disrupted a planet include: EPIC 204278916, Tabby's Star (KIC 8462852), PDS 110, RZ Piscium, WD 1145+017 and 47 Ursae Majoris.

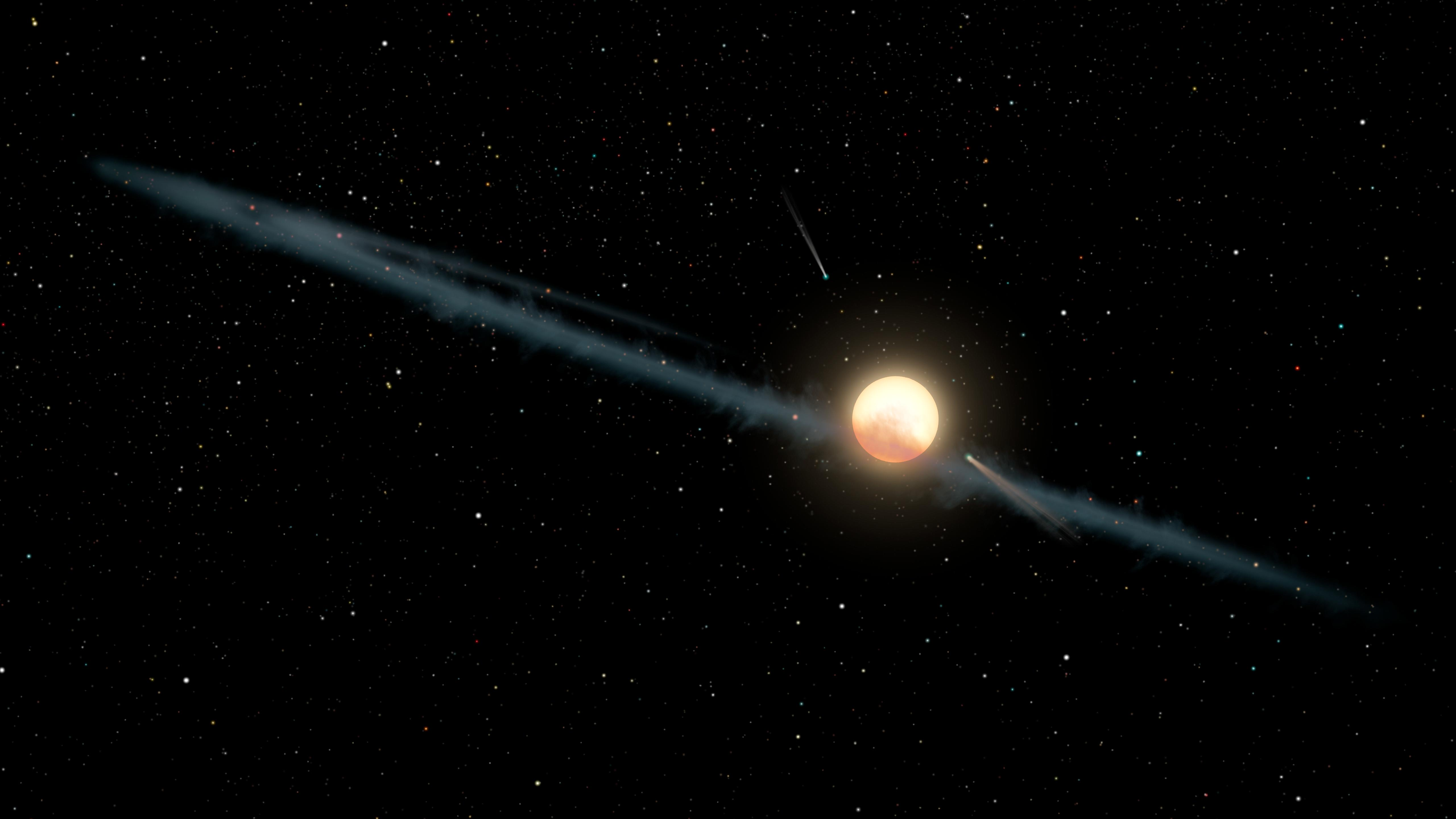
Artist concept of an "uneven ring of dust" surrounding Tabby's Star

== Tabby's Star light curve ==
Tabby's Star (KIC 8462852) is an F-type main-sequence star exhibiting unusual light fluctuations, including up to a 22% dimming in brightness. Several hypotheses have been proposed to explain these irregular changes, but none to date fully explain all aspects of the curve. One explanation is that an "uneven ring of dust" orbits Tabby's Star. However, in September 2019, astronomers reported that the observed dimmings of Tabby's Star may have been produced by fragments resulting from the disruption of an orphaned exomoon.

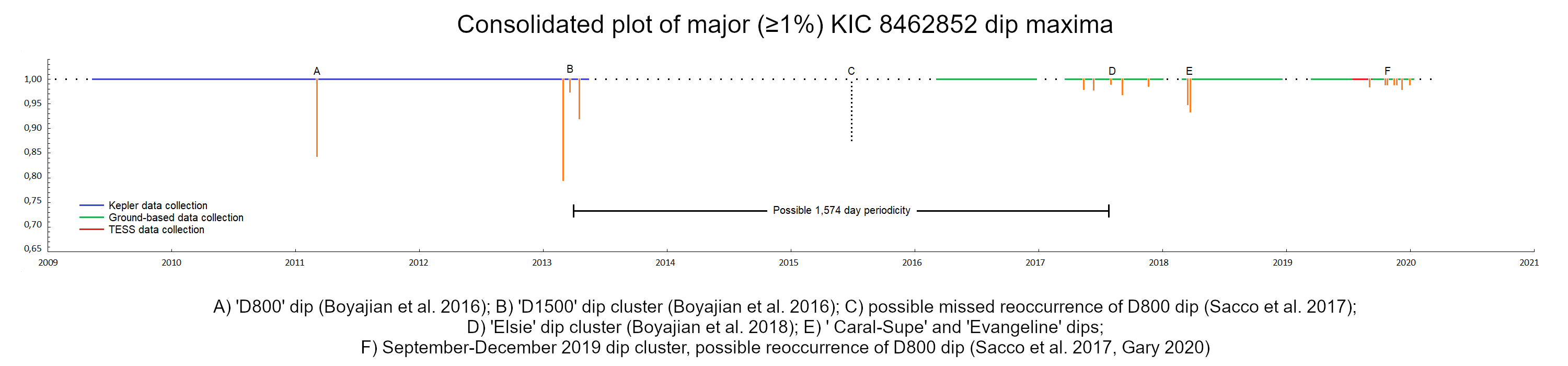
Consolidated plot of all known dimmings (as of 1 March 2020)
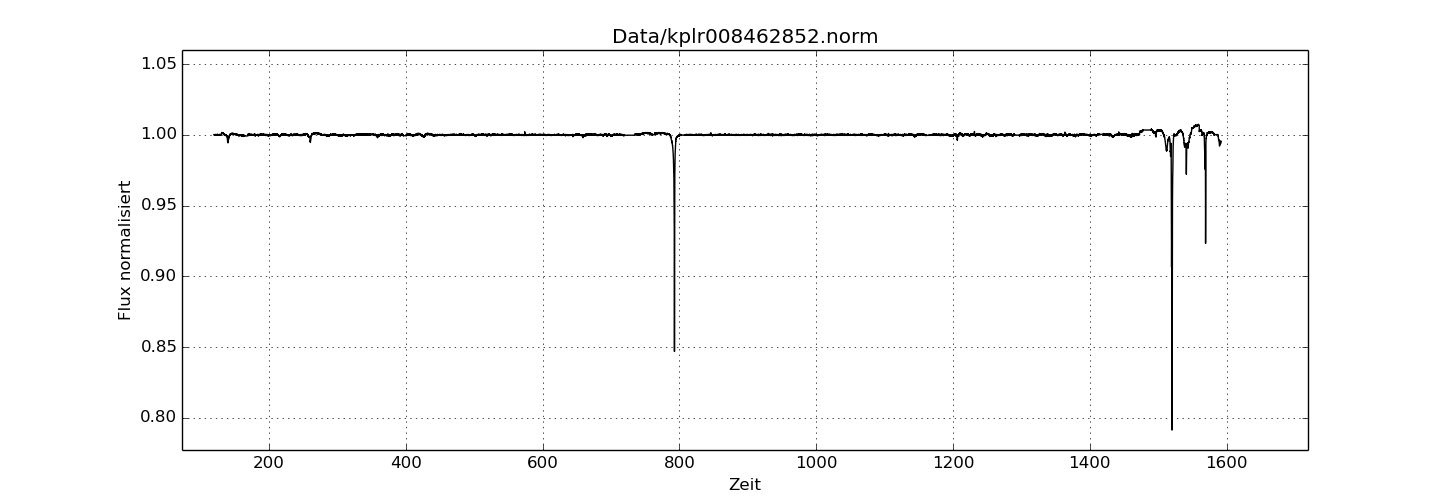
All light curve data − December 2009 to May 2013, scan days 0066 to 1587 (Kepler)

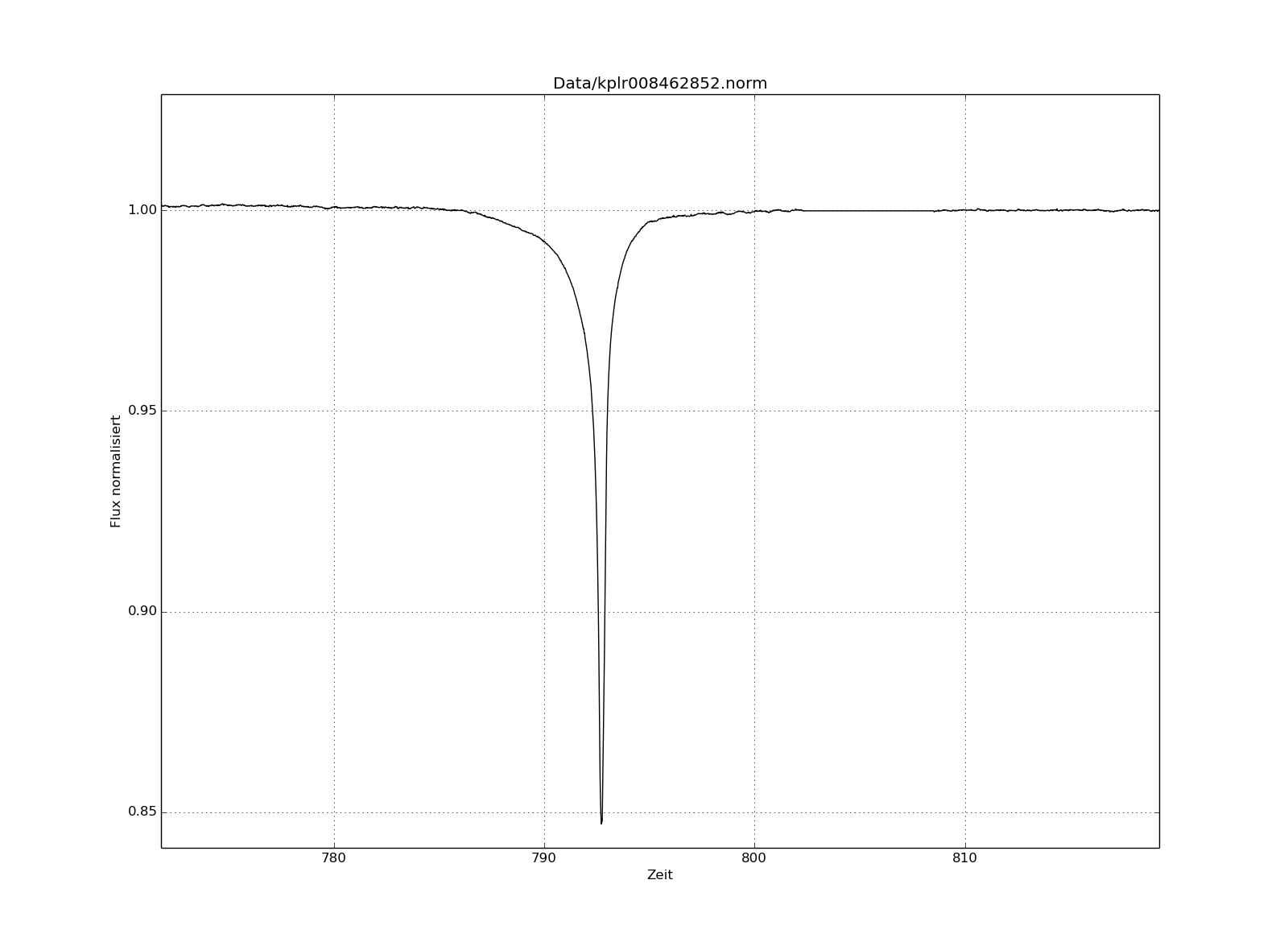
5 March 2011 − day 792
15% max dip (Kepler)

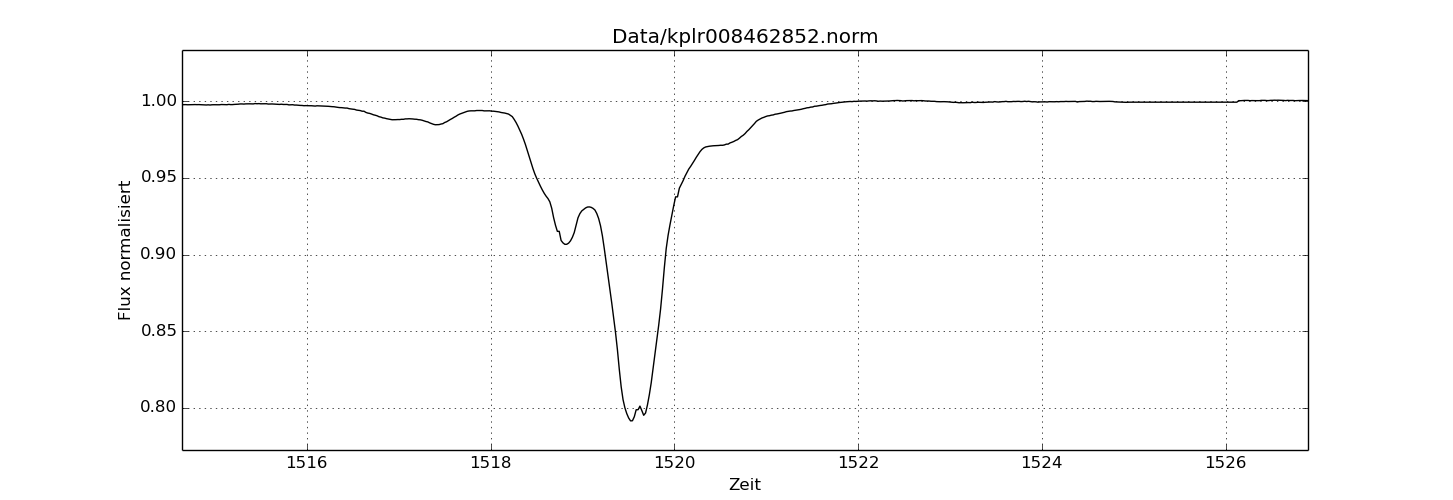
28 February 2013 − day 1519
22% max dip (Kepler)

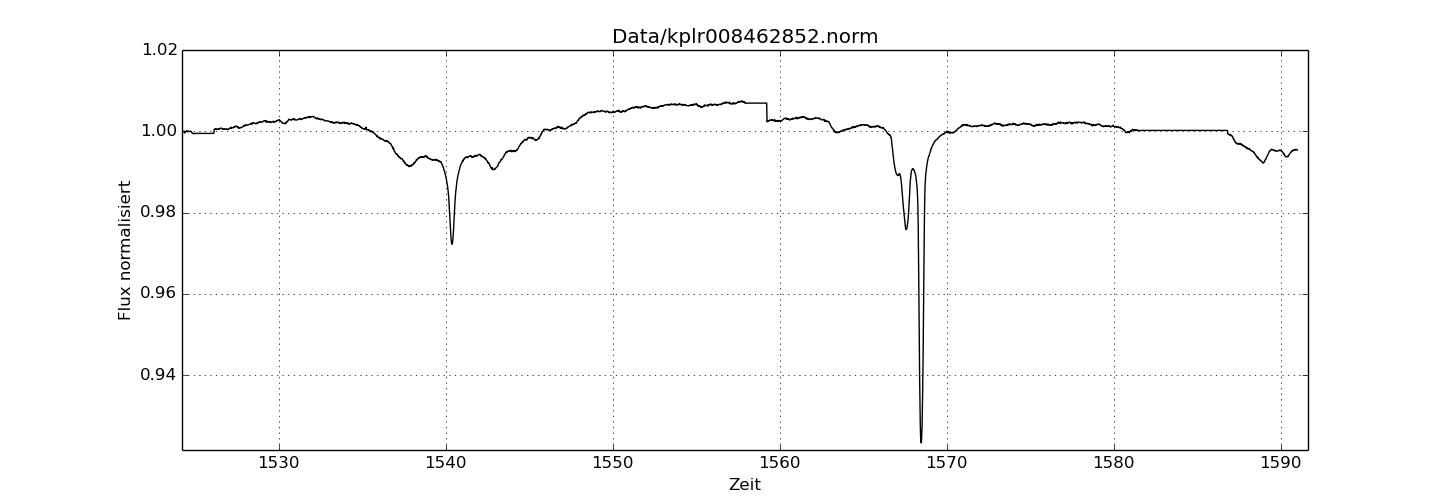
17 April 2013 − day 1568
8% max dip (Kepler)

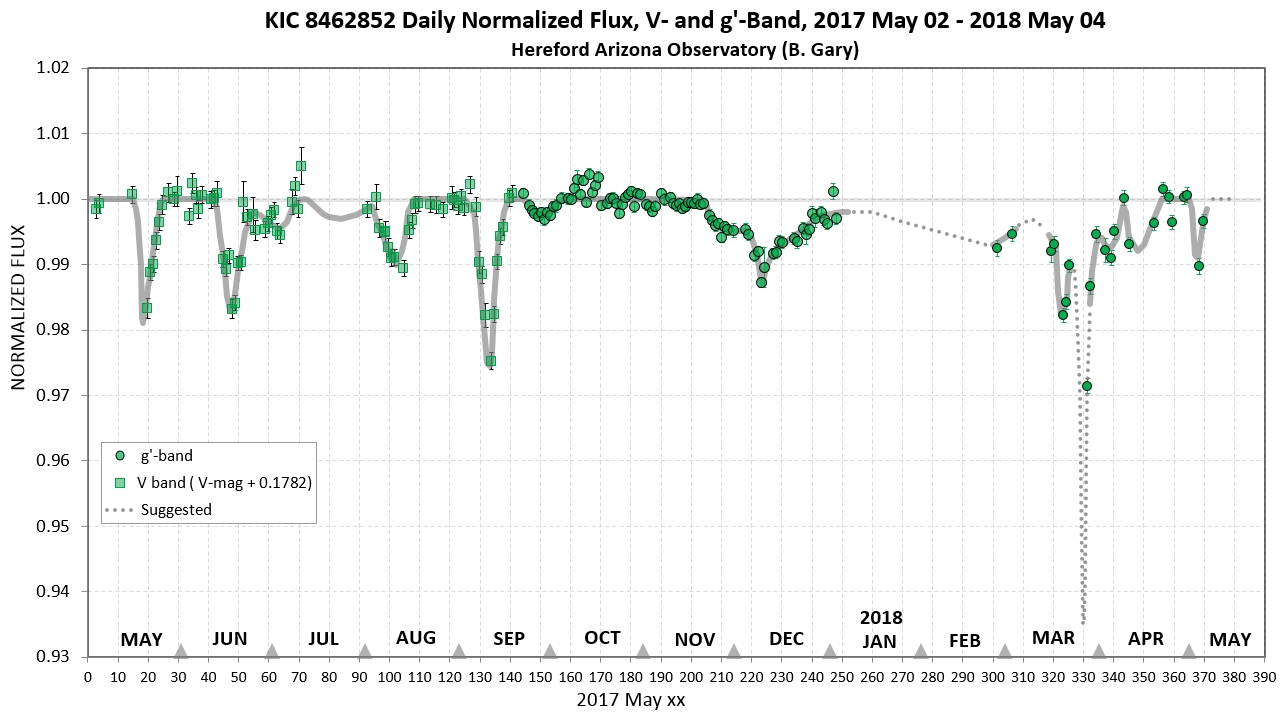
One year light curve −
up to 4 May 2018
(HAO)

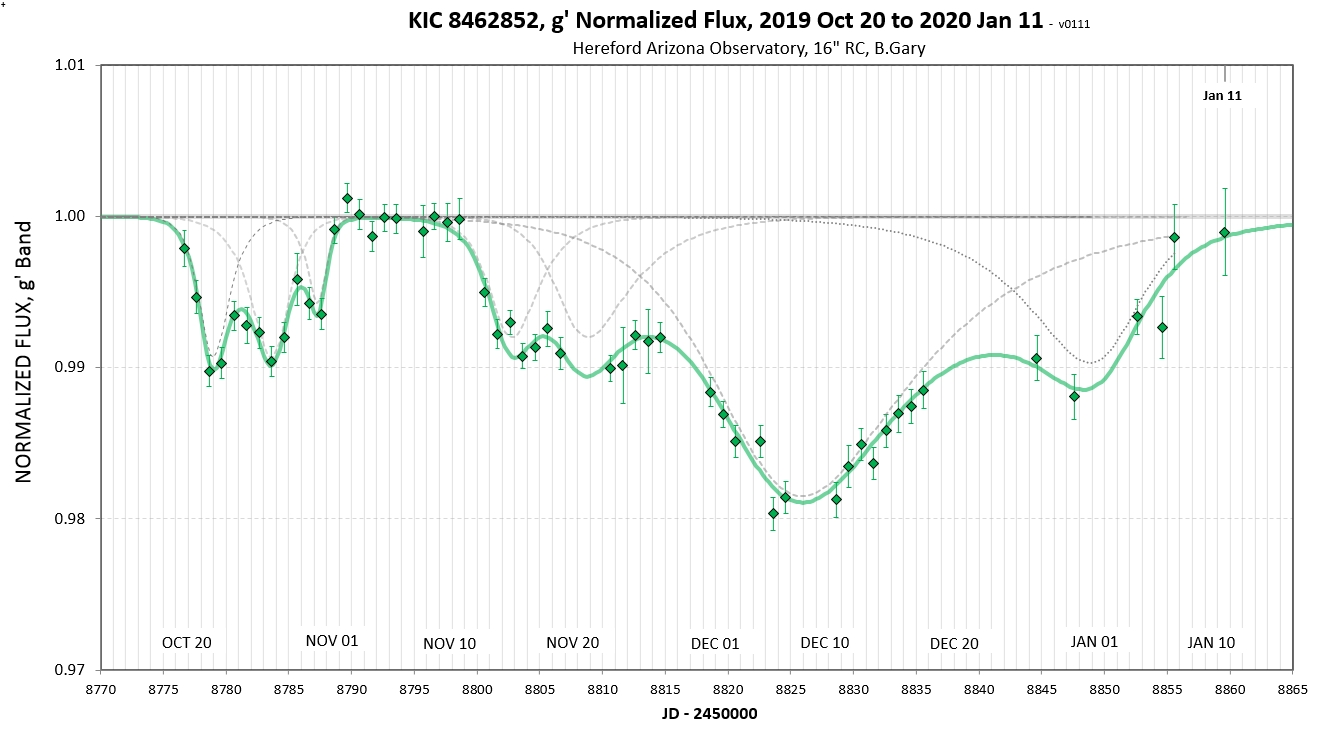
Light curve between 10 October 2019 and 11 January 2020 (HAO)

== See also ==
- Former dwarf planets
- Asteroid belt
- BD+20°307
- Formation and evolution of the Solar System
- Giant-impact hypothesis
- Interstellar medium
- List of stars that have unusual dimming periods
- Nebular hypothesis
- Planetesimal
- Protoplanetary disk
- Tidal force
- WD 0145+234 (star disrupting an exoasteroid)
