= Sarah Ballard =

American astronomer

Sarah Ashley Ballard
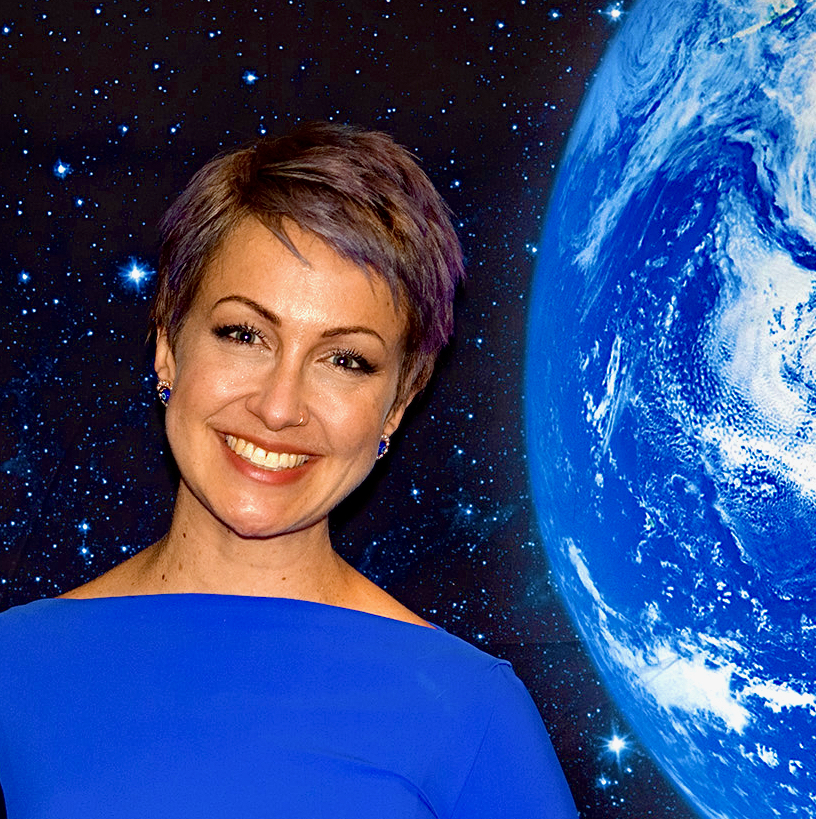
- Ballard in 2021
- Born: 1984 (age 41–42)
- Education: B.A. Astrophysics, UC Berkeley; Ph.D. Astronomy and Astrophysics, Harvard (2012)
- Known for: Discovery of Kepler-19c (first exoplanet by transit-timing variation)
- Scientific career
- Fields: Exoplanetary astrophysics
- Thesis: In Pursuit of New Worlds: Searches for and Studies of Transiting Exoplanets from Three Space-Based Observatories (2012)
- Doctoral advisor: David Charbonneau
- Website: drballard.space

Sarah Ballard (born 1984) is an American astronomer who is a professor at the University of Florida. She has been a Torres Fellow at the Massachusetts Institute of Technology, a L'Oreal Fellow, and a NASA Carl Sagan Fellow.

Ballard was part of a collaborative team that was the first to successfully use the transit-timing variation method. This resulted in her team's confirmation of this theoretical search procedure and the discovery of the Kepler-19 planetary system with that technique. Ballard took part in the discovery of four exoplanets (early numbered) in the Kepler spacecraft mission prior to its finding of significant quantities of planets around other stars.

Ballard has spoken about her experience as a victim of sexual harassment, about imposter syndrome, and about the controversy over the proposed Thirty Meter Telescope at the Mauna Kea Observatories.

== Education ==
As an undergraduate, Ballard started out as a gender studies major at the University of California, Berkeley. She completed a bachelor's degree from Berkeley in astrophysics in 2007, with a minor in physics. She did her graduate studies at Harvard University, completing a doctorate in astronomy and astrophysics in 2012 under the supervision of David Charbonneau.

== Fellowships ==
Ballard was a NASA Carl Sagan Fellow at the University of Washington where she did postdoctoral work; and in 2015 was awarded a Women in Science Fellows postdoctoral fellowship by L'Oréal USA to continue her research at MIT.

== Exoplanet discoveries ==
Ballard took part in the discovery of four exoplanets before she turned 30 years old, including Kepler-19c, the first exoplanet found using the transit-timing variation method on data from the Kepler space telescope mission.

Planet Discoveries of Sarah Ballard
Planets Discovered: 4
Number	Planet Designation	Type	Size Class	System	Constellation	Discoverer(s)	Year	Discovery Method	Telescope
1	Kepler-19b	Exoplanet		Kepler-19	Lyra	Sarah Ballard et al.		Transit	Kepler
2	Kepler-61b	Exoplanet		Kepler-61	Lyra	Sarah Ballard et al.		Transit	Kepler
3	Kepler-93b	Exoplanet	Super-Earth	Kepler-93	Lyra	Sarah Ballard et al.		Transit	Kepler
4	Kepler-19c	Exoplanet		Kepler-19	Lyra	Sarah Ballard et al.	2011	Transit-timing variation	Kepler
Table Legend:
Size class = Planet radius distribution (radius of Earth).: Earths = 1.0 to 1.3 Earth radii.; Super-Earths = 1.3 to 2.0 Earth radii.; Small Neptunes = 2.0 to 4.0 Earth radii.; Large Neptunes = 4.0 to 6.0 Earth radii.; Giant Planets = 6.0 to 22.6 Earth radii.					Discovery method =: Transit; Transit-timing variation				

== Transit-timing variation ==
The transit-timing variation method (TTV) is one of two techniques, along with the transit-duration variation method, proposed in 2001 by astronomer Jordi Miralda-Escudé. TTV was amplified upon in 2004 by astronomers Matthew J. Holman and Norman W. Murray; and by Eric Agol, Jason Steffen, Re’em Sari, and Will Clarkson. Ballard was the principal investigator in the 2009 application to use the Spitzer Space Telescope to examine "The First Exoplanet Smaller than the Earth". Ballard led the team which precisely estimated the diameter of Kepler-93b to within 1 percent, using TTV.

== Activism ==
When exoplanetologist Geoffrey Marcy resigned from the UC Berkeley faculty over charges that he had sexually harassed female undergraduate students, Ballard came out publicly as one of his victims in order to help bring attention to sexual harassment in academia. In an interview published by Wired, she said that "In the parking lot outside her apartment [...] he gave her advice about her current relationship. She opened the door and stuck her legs out, eager to leave. [...] He put his hand on the back of her neck and told her to relax, that everything would work out with that boy".

Ballard has written and conducted workshops on impostor syndrome. She was involved in a controversy about the proposed Thirty Meter Telescope at Mauna Kea Observatory. Her friend, Keolu Fox, a native Hawaiian, helped her see the issue from an indigenous perspective. Ballard spoke about the issue despite fears about the effects it may have on her career.

Ballard was one of a number of scientists who expressed concern in "An open letter to SCOTUS from professional physicists drafted by the Equity & Inclusion in Physics & Astronomy group" following oral arguments in the U.S. Supreme Court case commonly known as Fisher II involving inclusiveness in admissions policies at the University of Texas.

== See also ==
- Methods of detecting exoplanets
