= Kepler-25b =

Exoplanet

Discovery
- Discovered by: Steffen et al.
- Discovery site: Kepler Space Observatory
- Discovery date: 2012
- Detection method: Transits, and transit-timing variations

Designations
- Alternative names: KOI-244.02

Orbital characteristics
- Semi-major axis: 0.068 AU
- Eccentricity: 0.0029+0.0023 −0.0017
- Orbital period (sidereal): 6.238297±0.000017 d
- Inclination: 92.827+0.084 −0.083 º
- Star: Kepler-25

Physical characteristics
- Mean radius: 2.748+0.038 −0.035 R_{🜨}
- Mass: ≥8.7+2.5 −2.3 M_{🜨}
- Mean density: 2.32+0.67 −0.61 g/cm^{3}

Kepler-25b is an extrasolar planet orbiting the star Kepler-25, located in the constellation Lyra. The planet was first detected as a candidate extrasolar planet by the Kepler space telescope in 2011. It was confirmed, in 2012, by Jason Steffen and collaborators using transit-timing variations obtained by the Kepler Space Telescope.
