= Kepler-25c =

Exoplanet orbiting the star Kepler 25 in the constellation of Lyra

Discovery
- Discovered by: Steffen et al.
- Discovery site: Kepler Space Observatory
- Discovery date: 2012
- Detection method: Transits, and transit-timing variations

Designations
- Alternative names: KOI-244.01

Orbital characteristics
- Semi-major axis: 0.110 AU
- Eccentricity: 0.0061+0.0049 −0.0041
- Orbital period (sidereal): 12.7207±0.0001 d
- Inclination: 92.764+0.042 −0.039 º
- Star: Kepler-25

Physical characteristics
- Mean radius: 5.217+0.070 −0.065 R_{🜨}
- Mass: ≥15.2+1.3 −1.6 M_{🜨}
- Mean density: 0.588+0.053 −0.061 g/cm^{3}

Kepler-25c is an exoplanet orbiting the star Kepler-25, located in the constellation Lyra. The planet was first detected as a candidate extrasolar planet by the Kepler space telescope in 2011. It was confirmed, in 2012, by Jason Steffen and collaborators using transit-timing variations obtained by the Kepler Space Telescope. It orbits its parent star at only 0.110 astronomical units away, and at its distance it completes an orbit once every 12.7 days.
