= SDSS J010448.46+153501.8 =

Brown dwarf in the constellation Pisces

Observation data Epoch J2000 Equinox ICRS
- Constellation: Pisces
- Right ascension: 01^{h} 04^{m} 48.46^{s}
- Declination: +15° 35′ 01.8″

Characteristics
- Spectral type: usdL1.5

Astrometry
Distance	~750 ly

Details
Mass	0.086 ± 0.0015 (~90 M_{J}) M_{☉}
Surface gravity (log g)	5.5 ± 0.25 cgs
Temperature	2,450 ± 150 K
Metallicity [Fe/H]	−2.4 ± 0.2 dex
Age	~10 Gyr years

Other designations
- SDSS J0104+1535

SDSS J010448.46+153501.8 (abbreviated SDSS J0104+1535) is a brown dwarf located approximately 750 light-years away in the galactic halo of the Milky Way, in the constellation Pisces. Identified as the most massive and metal-poor substellar object known at the time of its characterization in 2017, it is composed of primordial gas consisting of more than 99.99% hydrogen and helium.

== Discovery and classification ==
SDSS J010448.46+153501.8 was initially catalogued by the Sloan Digital Sky Survey (SDSS) and previously classified as an sdM9.5 subdwarf.

In 2017, an international team of astronomers led by ZengHua Zhang obtained optical and near-infrared spectra of the object using the X-shooter instrument on the European Southern Observatory's Very Large Telescope (VLT) in Chile. Due to its notably blue color index (J − K = −0.15 ± 0.17) and extremely low metal content, the team reclassified it as a usdL1.5 ultra-subdwarf.

== Physical properties ==
SDSS J010448.46+153501.8 is an ancient object estimated to have formed roughly 10 billion years ago in the early universe.

- Composition: Its atmosphere is approximately 250 times purer than that of the Sun, containing less than 0.01% elements heavier than hydrogen and helium (metallicity of [Fe/H] = −2.4 ± 0.2).
- Mass: With an estimated mass of roughly 90 Jupiter masses (0.086 ± 0.0015 solar masses), it sits directly below the hydrogen-burning minimum mass limit for metal-poor objects (~0.088 solar masses), preventing it from sustaining stable nuclear fusion like a true star.
- Temperature and gravity: Spectral fitting with BT-Settl models indicates an effective temperature of approximately 2,450 ± 150 K and a surface gravity of log g = 5.5 ± 0.25.

== Scientific significance ==
Prior to the analysis of SDSS J010448.46+153501.8, it was uncertain whether brown dwarfs could form out of unenriched, primordial gas clouds. Its discovery demonstrated that substellar objects were able to form in the early galactic halo and suggests the existence of a larger, undiscovered population of ancient, ultra-pure brown dwarfs. Along with five other known L-type subdwarfs, it occupies a "halo brown dwarf transition zone" where unsteady nuclear fusion occurs, forming a substellar subdwarf gap for mid-L to early-T spectral types.
