= Boyajian =

Boyajian (Armenian: Պոյաճեան, derived from Turkish boyacı [boya "paint/dye" + cı "agentive suffix"], meaning "dyer" or "painter") is a surname. Notable people with the surname include:

- Albert A. Boyajian (born 1940), American business leader and founder of the Armenian American Political Action Committee
- Garen Boyajian (born 1987), Canadian actor
- Hampartsoum Boyadjian (1867–1915), also known as Murad the Great), Armenian militia member and political activist
- Tabetha S. Boyajian, American astronomer
- Zabelle C. Boyajian (1873–1957), Ottoman Armenian painter, writer, and translator
- Boyajian family, the character family depicted in the 2002 American television film A Christmas Visitor
