= Eric Agol =

American astronomer and astrophysicist

Eric Agol (/ˈeɪˌɡʊl/; born May 13, 1970, in Hollywood, California) is an American astronomer and astrophysicist who was awarded a Guggenheim Fellowship in 2017.

== Education ==
In 1992, Agol received a B.A. in Physics and Mathematics from University of California, Berkeley. He also earned a PhD in physics from University of California, Santa Barbara in 1997. He was awarded a Chandra Postdoctoral Fellowship in 2000, which he completed at Caltech.

== Career ==
In 2003, Agol became an assistant professor at the University of Washington. He subsequently was named an associate professor, and then professor in 2014, in the Department of Astronomy. He advised former graduate student Jason Steffen and former postdoc Sarah Ballard. Agol was awarded the 2016 Lecar Prize at Harvard University.

== Research ==
In 2000, together with Fulvio Melia and Heino Falcke, he proposed the possibility of observing the event horizon of the supermassive black hole in the center of the Milky Way (Sagittarius A *) with interconnected radio telescopes (VLBI at submillimeter wavelengths). This was implemented as the Event Horizon Telescope which detected the shadow of the black hole in the galaxy M87 in 2019, confirming a prediction of General Relativity.

In 2003, he predicted the possibility of the discovery of gravitational lensing in binary stars with Kepler (for example, a white dwarf with a sun-like star), which was also observed with the telescope.

In 2005, he was one of the first to show that exoplanet transits can vary over time due to accompanying planets. He coined the term transit timing variation to describe this.

He proposed the measurement of the infrared phase-variations of Hot Jupiters with the Spitzer Space Telescope and invented the longitudinal mapping from the phase curve, creating a Weather map of the exoplanet HD 189733 b.

In 2011 he proposed that white dwarfs might support a habitable zone for planets which migrate inwards after the red giant phase, and that these could be found with transit surveys. In 2020, a transiting giant planet was found to orbit a white dwarf near this zone with the TESS spacecraft.

He joined the Kepler Space Telescope team to discover the planet Kepler-36b. He subsequently discovered the Earth-like planet Kepler-62f, which is 1.4 times the diameter of the Earth and is located in the Goldilock zone. He also was part of the team which discovered the seven-planet system, TRAPPIST-1, including three Earth-like planets residing in the Goldilock zone.

He developed a fast Gaussian process technique based on the Rybicki Press algorithm which has been used to model stellar variability in data from the NASA TESS spacecraft.

Most recently he led a team which used transit-timing with the Spitzer Space Telescope to precisely characterize the Terrestrial Planets in the TRAPPIST-1 system, showing that they share a common composition that differs from the terrestrial planets of the Solar System

== Personal life ==
Agol is the identical twin brother of mathematician Ian Agol.
