= Tabetha S. Boyajian =

American astronomer

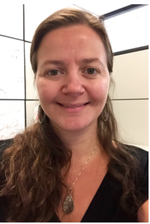
- Education: Charleston College (BS); Georgia State University (MS, PhD)
- Known for: Investigation of the strange light curve of KIC 8462852
- Scientific career
- Fields: Exoplanetary astrophysics; Stellar observations; High angular resolution astronomy
- Thesis: Sizing up the Stars (2009)
- Doctoral advisor: Harold A. McAlister
- Website: www.astro.yale.edu/tabetha/Site/Welcome.html

Tabetha "Tabby" Suzanne Boyajian is an American astronomer and associate professor at Louisiana State University. She works in the fields of stellar interferometry, stellar spectroscopy, exoplanet research, and high angular resolution astronomy, all particularly at optical and infrared wavelengths. Boyajian was the lead author of the September 2015 paper "Where's the Flux?", which investigated the highly unusual light curve of KIC 8462852; the star is colloquially known as Tabby's Star in her honor.

== Background ==
Boyajian graduated from The Galloway School in Atlanta, Georgia. She received a BS degree in Physics with concentration in Astronomy from the College of Charleston in 2003, an MS degree in Physics from Georgia State University in 2005, and a PhD degree in astronomy from the same university in 2009. She studied the sizes of nearby stars similar to the Sun, using GSU's CHARA array, a long-baseline optical and infrared interferometer located at Mount Wilson Observatory. Boyajian was awarded a Hubble Fellowship, and stayed at Georgia State University to study sizes of nearby stars much smaller than the Sun and stars with planets. Astronomer Sarah Ballard described this as "truly remarkable" work and has used what she calls this "precious sample" of data on nearby small stars for the "characterization by proxy" method to help investigate the far more distant exoplanet Kepler-61b.

She was a post-doctoral fellow from 2012–16 at Yale University, working with Debra Fischer.

As of 2015, Boyajian is secretary and steering committee member of Division G Stars and Stellar Physics of the International Astronomical Union.

Boyajian is also manager of the Planet Hunters project in which amateurs analyze data from the Kepler space telescope. She co-wrote the book Extrasolar Planets and Their Host Stars with Kaspar von Braun in 2017 (von Braun & Boyajian 2017).

== Tabby's Star ==
On 14 October 2015, a strange pattern of light from star KIC 8462852, nicknamed "Tabby's Star" after Boyajian – the lead researcher who discovered the irregular light fluctuation – was captured by the Kepler Space Telescope, and raised speculation that a Dyson sphere may have been discovered.

In February 2016, Boyajian gave a TED talk where she explained why she and others thought they had possibly discovered a massive alien structure and speculation on Dyson's Spheres:

Extraordinary claims require extraordinary evidence, and it is my job, my responsibility, as an Astronomer to remind people that alien hypotheses should always be a last resort.

Wanting to understand the strange light pattern, Boyajian put several hypotheses to the test. The research team's first thought was that it was due to an exoplanet detected around this massive star, but the dips in light lasted anywhere from 5 to 80 days and were erratically spaced apart thus ruling out any kind of an orbit for one celestial object. A dust cloud was proposed but the star showed no signs of being young so a dust cloud was highly improbable. Lastly, a comet shower was hypothesized. However, as Boyajian pointed out in her TED talk this was the most likely out of all the hypotheses and yet was still highly improbable.

It would take hundreds of comets to reproduce what we're observing. And these are only the comets that happen to pass between us and the star. And so in reality, we're talking thousands to tens of thousands of comets.

So after all the natural explanations turned up weak, her team decided to send off their research to SETI (Search for extraterrestrial intelligence) to rule out aliens. After reviewing the research the SETI Institute was so intrigued that they decided to study the star themselves and pointed their Allen Telescope Array (ATA) at the star "with hopes of catching a tell-tale signal that might reveal a technological civilization."

The SETI Institute mentioned what caught their eye and made them take on the research themselves: "Even more interesting, the timing of the present dip (in light) suggests that whatever this material is, it is situated at just the right distance from the star to be in the 'habitable zone,' where we believe life like ours could develop as it has on Earth."

Being as skeptical as Boyajian was, she took SETI's approach and allowed herself to have a bit of fun in hypothesizing what the light pattern could have been. In her TED Talk she joked:

Another idea that's one of my personal favorites is that we had just witnessed an interplanetary space battle and the catastrophic destruction of a planet. Now, I admit that this would produce a lot of dust that we don't observe. But if we're already invoking aliens in this explanation, then who is to say they didn't efficiently clean up all this mess for recycling purposes?

The search for answers to KIC 8462852 is still ongoing, with two papers published in the summer of 2019 offering plausible scientific scenarios, involving larger moons being stripped from their planets.

== Publications ==
- von Braun, Kaspar; Boyajian, Tabetha (2017). Extrasolar Planets and Their Host Stars. Springer Briefs in Astronomy. Cham, Switzerland: Springer. ISBN 978-3-319-61196-9.

== See also ==
- Methods of detecting exoplanets
