= NGC 6791 =

Open cluster in the constellation Lyra

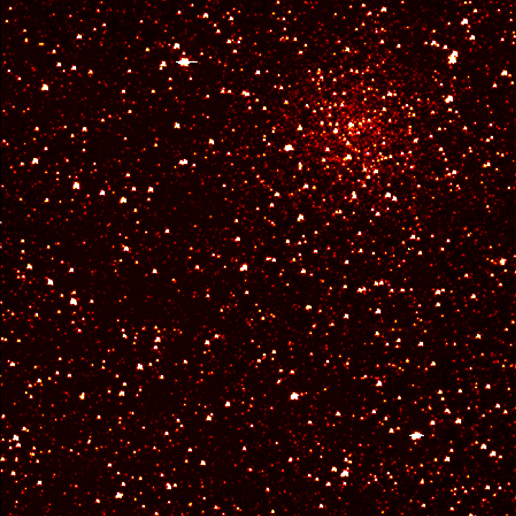
- Detail from the Kepler image showing NGC 6791. Celestial north is to the left.^{a}

Observation data (J2000 epoch)
- Right ascension: 19^{h} 20^{m} 53^{s}
- Declination: +37° 46.3′
- Distance: ~13,300 ly (4078 pc)
- Apparent magnitude (V): +9.5
- Apparent dimensions (V): 16'

Physical characteristics
- Estimated age: 8.46±0.66 Gyr
- One of the oldest known open clusters
- Other designations: C 1919+377, Cl Berkeley 46, OCl 142.0, GC 4492

Associations
- Constellation: Lyra

NGC 6791 is an open star cluster in the constellation Lyra. It was discovered by Friedrich August Theodor Winnecke in 1853. At roughly 8 billion years old, and with an iron to hydrogen abundance ratio that is more than twice that of the Sun, it is one of the oldest and most metal-rich clusters in the Milky Way. This is contrary to the typical rule-of-thumb where older means more metal-poor. Compounded with the fact that it has an unusually high population of stars, NGC 6791 is among the most studied clusters in the sky.

== Age studies ==
Among the dimmest stars in the cluster are groups of white dwarfs that are 6 billion years old and another group that appear to be 4 billion years old. The ages are out of sync with those of the cluster's normal stars, which are 8 billion years old. This seeming contradiction in age for this cluster has been studied and a solution proposed with age of about 8 billion years.

== The Kepler Mission ==
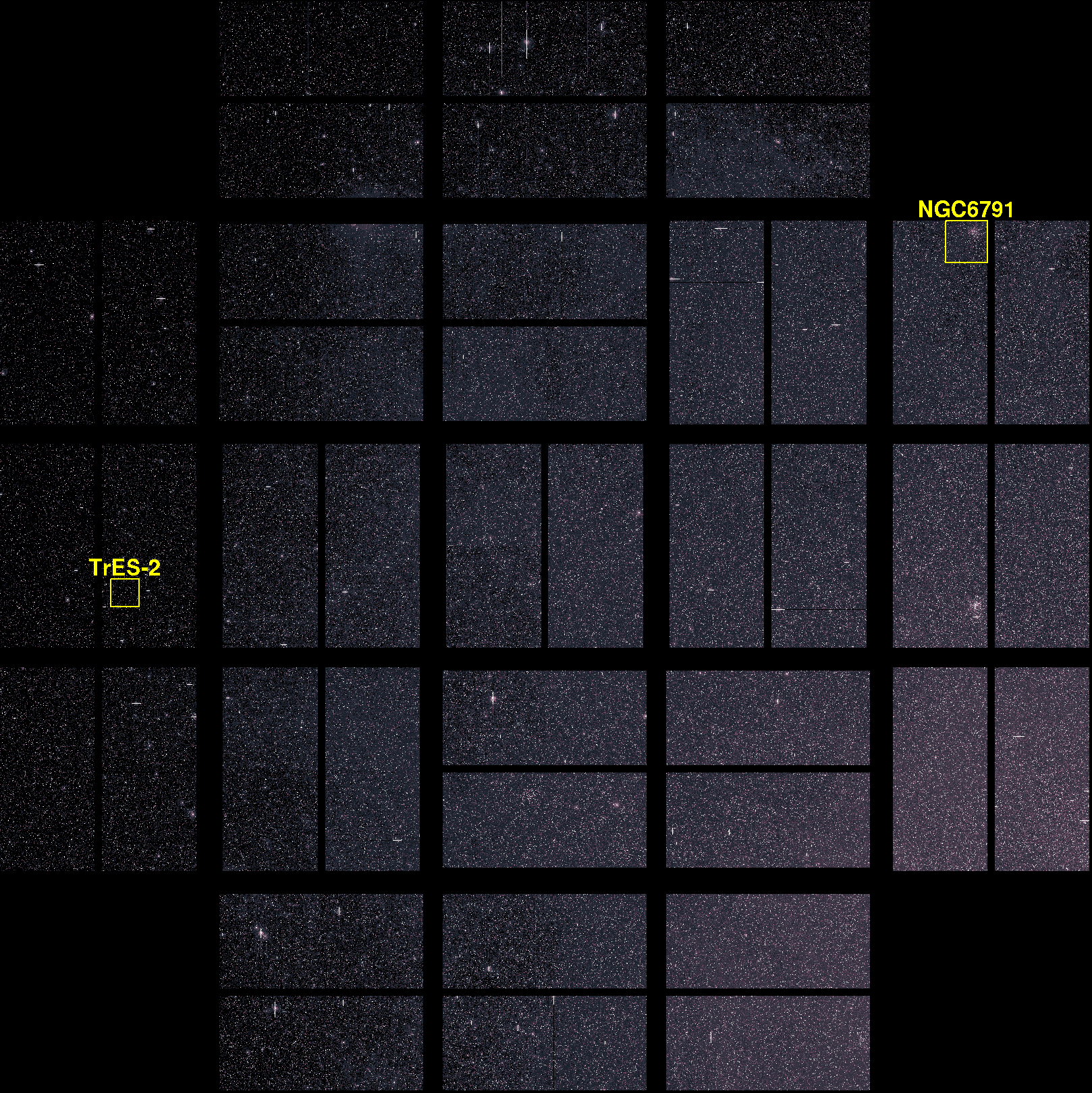
An image from Kepler with NGC 6791 and another point of interest outlined. Celestial north is to the left.^{a}

In March 2009 NASA launched the Kepler Mission spacecraft. This spacecraft was a dedicated mission to discover extrasolar planets by the transit method from solar orbit. In April 2009 the project released the first light images from the spacecraft and NGC 6791 was one of two objects highlighted.

The planet hosting star Kepler-19, discovered from Kepler data, is located approximately 5 arcminutes northwest of NGC 6791. The star has a differing proper motion to the cluster and is also much closer, so it is unrelated.

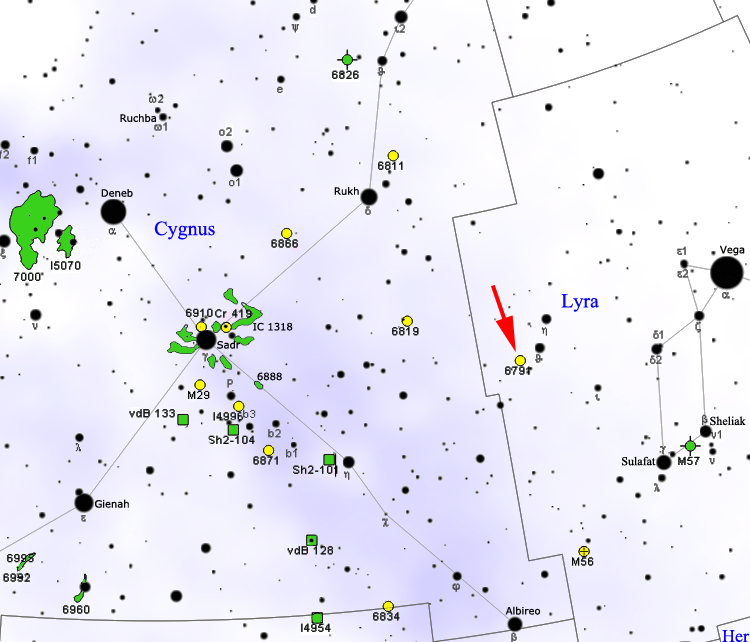
Map showing location of NGC 6791 (Roberto Mura)

== Notes ==
- Note a: The images are rotated counterclockwise approximately 130° from the detector orientation against the sky.
