= GIR =

GIR may refer to:

== Places ==
- Gir, Qom, in Qom Province, Iran
- Gir Forest National Park, in Gujarat, India

== Other uses ==
- Gir (cattle), a breed
- GIR (Invader Zim), a character in the animated series
- Games in relief, a baseball statistic
- Geographic information retrieval
- Glen Iris railway station, Melbourne
- Great Indian Rock, a music festival in India
- Independent Grouping for Reflection (French: Groupement Indépendant de Reflexion), a former CAR political party
- Jean Giraud (1938–2012), French comics artist
- Vandu language, spoken in Ha Giang Province, Vietnam
- Santiago Vila Airport, Girardot, Cundinamarca, Colombia
- Green in regulation; see Glossary of golf

== See also ==
- Gyr (disambiguation)
