= Steffen Boarding Method =

Proposed 'perfect' aeroplane boarding method

The Steffen Boarding Method, also known as the Steffen Perfect or simply the Steffen Method, is a proposed "perfect aeroplane boarding method" that would enable optimally fast and convenient way of sequencing passengers. The method was first introduced by astrophysicist Jason Steffen in 2008.

The method attempts to eliminate the buffers that slow down plane boarding, while simultaneously optimising speed and efficiency. The method has been criticised for its lack of human headway, as it would separate those boarding in groups and require a perfectly organised line, as well as uniform stowing and seating time. Steffen initially published his theory in 2008 in the Journal of Air Transport Management, and showed that his method was twice as fast as the standard back-to-front method, and 20-30% faster than random boarding.

In 2014, Steffen told Wired that despite the popularity of the method among passengers since the paper's publication, no airline had adopted the method as of yet.

== Origin ==
Most airlines tend to board passengers in a somewhat hierarchical system, loading passengers into planes back-to-front, but giving priority to those who have more tenure with that airline. However, the rest of the passengers, who have to board back-to-front, are aware of the inefficiency which is why some passengers attempt to pile on before the call of their gate. Another factor that slows down this boarding method is stowing. This was observed in an episode of MythBusters in which the presenters had 173 people board a plane in different orders.

In an attempt to rectify this, Jason Steffen conducted simulations and experiments to calculate the mathematically quickest way to board a plane. Steffen used his method on a 72-seat plane in a controlled experiment, finding his results to be faster than the average method.

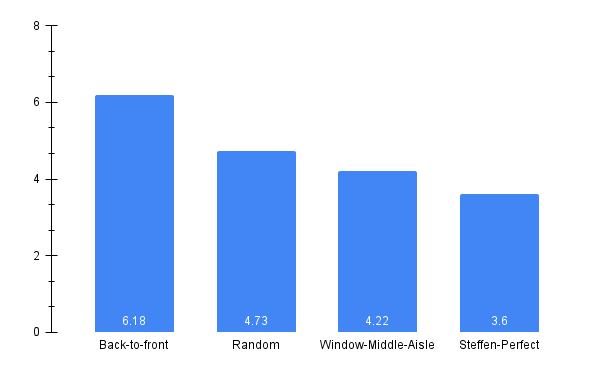
Chart comparing Speed of boarding methods in minutes (Results of Steffen's experiment, 2011)

== Method ==
The method files people into a plane in a straight line, and people are seated in the following order, from back to front:

- Window seat, odd-numbered.
- Window seat, even-numbered.
- Middle seat, odd-numbered.
- Middle seat, even-numbered.
- Aisle seat, odd-numbered.
- Aisle seat, even-numbered.

This way, if the passengers are efficient in stowing their luggage and seating themselves, the plane should be filled in the ideal time. It eliminates the buffers of climbing over already occupied seats and multiple people stowing in a line.

== Criticism ==
Steffen's method has been criticised for not giving leeway to human imperfections and needs, including keeping together boarding groups/children and adults, lateness, and organising large groups into a single file line ordered perfectly. Steffen said this was likely the reason no airlines have adopted his method.

=== Variations ===
Due to criticisms of the stress and required organisation of the method, some have suggested other sub-optimal boarding methods that don't take such a toll on human imperfections.

Steffen realised the impracticality of the logistics of his method, and so devised a modified method, where people boarded in the order of:

1. Right side, odd-numbered rows
2. Left side, odd-numbered rows
3. Right side, even-numbered rows
4. Left side, even-numbered rows

This "Steffen Modified" method addresses the criticism of groups being split up and decreases logistical concerns, but is twice as slow as the optimal method.

Another speedy boarding method suggested is the Southwest method, which consists of people being able to choose where they want to sit. While not as fast as Steffen, this method has been shown to have been faster than the standard back-to-front method in controlled experiments.
