= Kepler-19c =

Neptunian planet orbiting Kepler-19

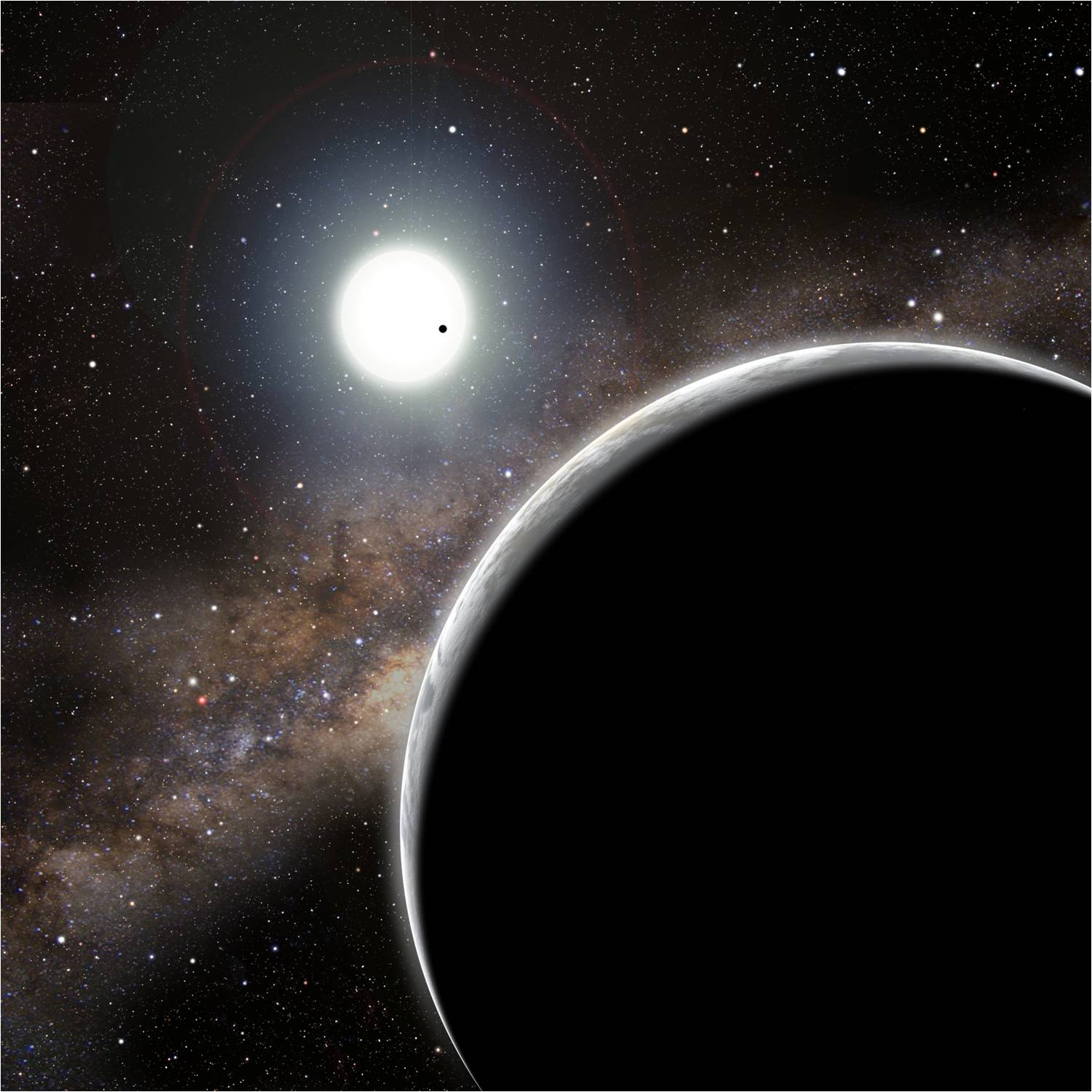
- Kepler-19c

Discovery
- Discovered by: Sarah Ballard et al.
- Discovery date: 2011
- Detection method: Transit timing variation

Orbital characteristics
- Orbital period (sidereal): 28.731+0.012 −0.005 d

Physical characteristics
- Mass: 13.1±2.7 Earth masses

Kepler-19c is an extra-solar planet orbiting the star Kepler-19 approximately 717 light years from Earth.

== Discovery ==
The planet was discovered as a result of examinations of data from the previously discovered exoplanet, Kepler-19b. Timing variations in the orbital period of the first planet necessitated gravitational forces to be acting upon the planet, resulting from an additional body in the vicinity, acting to cause a variation of transition of five minutes per orbit. The lead author of the paper announcing the discovery was Sarah Ballard.

== See also ==
- List of extrasolar planet firsts
