= Kepler-25 =

Yellow-white hued star in the constellation Lyra

Observation data Epoch J2000 Equinox J2000
- Constellation: Lyra
- Right ascension: 19^{h} 06^{m} 33.2141^{s}
- Declination: +39° 29′ 16.359″
- Apparent magnitude (V): 10.623±0.053

Characteristics
- Evolutionary stage: main sequence
- Spectral type: F
- Apparent magnitude (B): 11.337±0.016
- Variable type: Planetary transit variable

Astrometry
Proper motion (μ)	RA: −0.303(14) mas/yr Dec.: 6.109(13) mas/yr
Parallax (π)	4.1456±0.0113 mas
Distance	787 ± 2 ly (241.2 ± 0.7 pc)

Details
Mass	1.159+0.040 −0.051 M_{☉}
Radius	1.297±0.015 R_{☉}
Luminosity	2.406+0.126 −0.128 L_{☉}
Surface gravity (log g)	4.275+0.007 −0.008 cgs
Temperature	6270±79 K
Metallicity [Fe/H]	−0.05±0.10 dex
Rotation	23.147±0.039 days
Rotational velocity (v sin i)	9.5 km/s
Age	3.45+0.81 −0.72 Gyr

Other designations
- Gaia DR2 2100451630105041152, KOI-244, KIC 4349452, TYC 3124-1264-1, 2MASS J19063321+3929164

Database references
SIMBAD	data
Exoplanet Archive	data
KIC	data

Kepler-25 is a star in the northern constellation of Lyra. It is slightly larger and more massive than the Sun, with a luminosity 2 1/2 times that of the Sun. With an apparent visual magnitude of 10.6, this star is too faint to be seen with the naked eye.

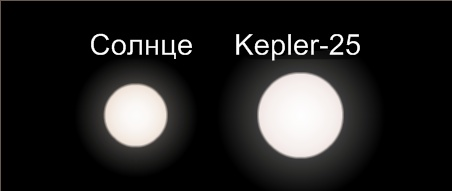

== Planetary system ==
In 2011, two candidate planets were found transiting this star by the Kepler space telescope. These planets are very close to yet not lie in the 1:2 orbital resonance to each other, indicating the absence of other planetary objects in the inner part of the planetary systems. These planets were confirmed through transit-timing variation method. A third planet was discovered through follow-up radial velocity measurements and was confirmed in January 2014.

The plane of planetary orbits is well aligned with the equatorial plane of the star, misalignment angle equal to 7±8°

The Kepler-25 planetary system
Companion (in order from star)	Mass	Semimajor axis (AU)	Orbital period (days)	Eccentricity	Inclination	Radius
b	8.7+2.5 −2.3 M_{🜨}	0.068	6.238297±0.000017	0.0029+0.0023 −0.0017	92.827+0.084 −0.083°	2.748+0.038 −0.035 R_{🜨}
c	15.2+1.3 −1.6 M_{🜨}	0.11	12.7207±0.0001	0.0061+0.0049 −0.0041	92.764+0.042 −0.039°	5.217+0.070 −0.065 R_{🜨}
d	71.9±9.8 M_{🜨}	—	122.4+0.0 −0.7	0.13+0.13 −0.09	—	—
