= Tabby's Star =

Star noted for unusual dimming events

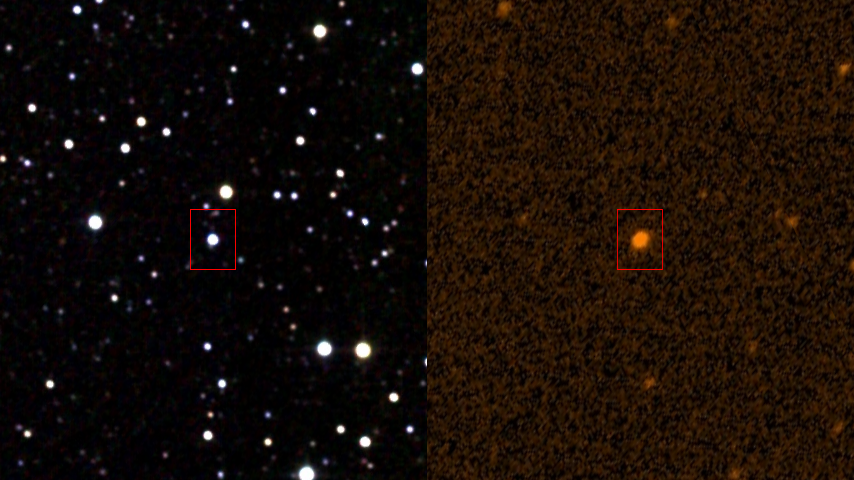
- Tabby's Star in infrared (left) and ultraviolet (right)

Observation data Epoch J2000.0 Equinox ICRS
- Constellation: Cygnus
- Right ascension: 20^{h} 06^{m} 15.45265^{s}
- Declination: +44° 27′ 24.7909″
- Apparent magnitude (V): +11.705±0.017

Characteristics

KIC 8462852 A
- Evolutionary stage: Main sequence
- Spectral type: F3V
- B−V color index: 0.557
- V−R color index: 0.349
- R−I color index: 0.305
- J−H color index: 0.212
- J−K color index: 0.264

KIC 8462852 B
- Spectral type: M2V

Astrometry

KIC 8462852 A
Radial velocity (R_{v})	−0.46±3.91 km/s
Proper motion (μ)	RA: −10.375±0.012 mas/yr Dec.: −10.273±0.011 mas/yr
Parallax (π)	2.2545±0.0099 mas
Distance	1,447 ± 6 ly (444 ± 2 pc)
Absolute magnitude (M_{V})	3.08

KIC 8462852 B
Proper motion (μ)	RA: −10.097±0.231 mas/yr Dec.: −10.610±0.254 mas/yr
Parallax (π)	2.2470±0.1620 mas
Distance	1,500 ± 100 ly (450 ± 30 pc)

Position (relative to Tabby's Star)
Component	KIC 8462852 B
Epoch of observation	2019
Angular distance	1,951.88±0.06 mas
Position angle	96.062±0.004°
Projected separation	880±10 AU

Details

KIC 8462852 A
Mass	1.43 M_{☉}
Radius	1.58 R_{☉}
Luminosity (bolometric)	4.68 L_{☉}
Surface gravity (log g)	4.0±0.2 cgs
Temperature	6,750±120 K
Metallicity	0.0±0.1
Rotation	0.8797±0.0001 days
Rotational velocity (v sin i)	84±4 km/s

KIC 8462852 B
Mass	0.44±0.02 M_{☉}
Radius	0.45±0.02 R_{☉}
Temperature	3720±70 K

Other designations
- TYC 3162-665-1, Boyajian's Star, WISE J200615.45+442724.7, KIC 8462852, NSVS 5711291, Gaia DR2 2081900940499099136, 2MASS J20061546+4427248, UCAC4 673-083862, TIC 185336364, APASS 52502626

Database references
SIMBAD	A
- B

Tabby's Star or Boyajian's Star (designated as KIC 8462852 in the Kepler Input Catalog) is a binary star in the constellation Cygnus approximately 1,470 light-years (450 parsecs) from Earth. The system is composed of an F-type main-sequence star and a red dwarf companion.

Unusual light fluctuations of Tabby's Star, including up to a 22% dimming in brightness, were discovered by citizen scientists as part of the Planet Hunters project. The discovery was made from data collected by the Kepler space telescope, which observed changes in the brightness of distant stars to detect exoplanets. Several hypotheses have been proposed to explain the star's large irregular changes in brightness, but as of 2024, none of them fully explain all aspects of the resulting light curve. It has been suggested that it is an extraterrestrial megastructure, but evidence tends to discount this suggestion.

In September 2019, astronomers reported that the observed dimmings of Tabby's Star may have been produced by fragments resulting from the disruption of an orphaned exomoon.

== Nomenclature ==
No proper name for this star has been approved by the International Astronomical Union. The informal names "Tabby's Star" and "Boyajian's Star" refer to American astronomer Tabetha S. Boyajian, who was the lead author of the scientific paper that announced the discovery of the star's irregular light fluctuations in 2015. Some astronomers and science communicators, including Jason Wright, Douglas Vakoch and Phil Plait, prefer using the name "Boyajian's Star" instead of "Tabby's Star". Wright, Vakoch and Plait all argued that the nickname "Tabby's Star" is sexist because it uses a diminutive form of Boyajian's first name, which is considered informal and inconsistent with the tradition of naming stars after the surnames of people, who are often men. (Note: Wright gives the examples Barnard's Star, Kapteyn's Star and Przybylski's Star.) According to Plait, Boyajian herself calls the star "Boyajian's Star". In 2019, Plait wrote that Boyajian understood the appeal of calling it "Tabby's Star", because her surname can be difficult to pronounce, but that she recognized the importance of using the name "Boyajian's Star" to avoid sexism.

Another nickname, "WTF Star", is a reference to the discovery paper's subtitle "where's the flux?", which highlights the observed dips in the star's radiative flux. The star has also been given the nickname "LGM-2"—a homage to the first pulsar discovered, PSR B1919+21, which was given the nickname "LGM-1" when it was originally hypothesized to be a transmission from an extraterrestrial civilization.

Valid stellar designations have been given in various star catalogues. In the Kepler Input Catalog, a collection of astronomical objects catalogued by the Kepler space telescope, Tabby's Star is known as KIC 8462852. In the Tycho-2 Catalogue, an enhanced collection of stars catalogued by Hipparcos, the star is known as TYC 3162-665-1. In the infrared Two Micron All-Sky Survey (2MASS), the star is identified as 2MASS J20061546+4427248.

== Location ==
Location of Tabby's Star in the constellation Cygnus (circled in red)

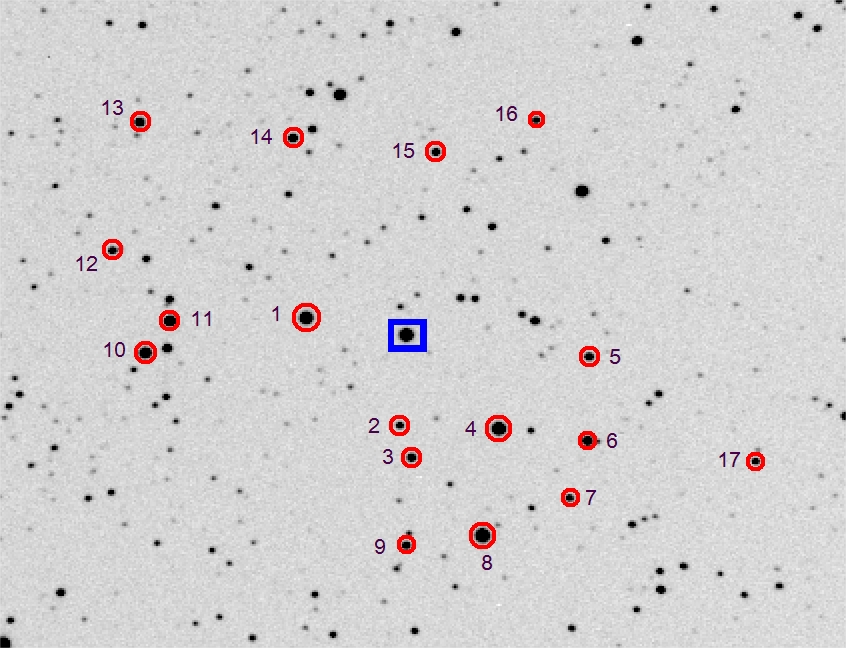
Finder image: KIC 8462852 (blue square) and nearby stars – stable reference stars are in red circles. (FOV=12.5 × 9.6 minutes of arc, NE at upper-left)

Tabby's Star in the constellation Cygnus is roughly halfway between the bright stars Deneb and Delta Cygni as part of the Northern Cross. It is situated south of 31 Cygni, and northeast of the star cluster NGC 6866. While only a few arcminutes away from the cluster, it is unrelated and closer to the Sun than it is to the star cluster.

With an apparent magnitude of 11.7, the star cannot be seen by the naked eye, but is visible with a 5-inch (130 mm) telescope in a dark sky with little light pollution.

== History of observations ==
Tabby's Star was observed as early as the year 1890. The star was cataloged in the Tycho, 2MASS, UCAC4, and WISE astronomical catalogs (published in 1997, 2003, 2009 and 2012, respectively).

The main source of information about the luminosity fluctuations of Tabby's Star is the Kepler space telescope. During its primary and extended mission from 2009 to 2013 it continuously monitored the light curves of over 100,000 stars in a patch of sky in the constellations Cygnus and Lyra.

=== 2017 light fluctuations ===
Normalized flux for Tabby's Star

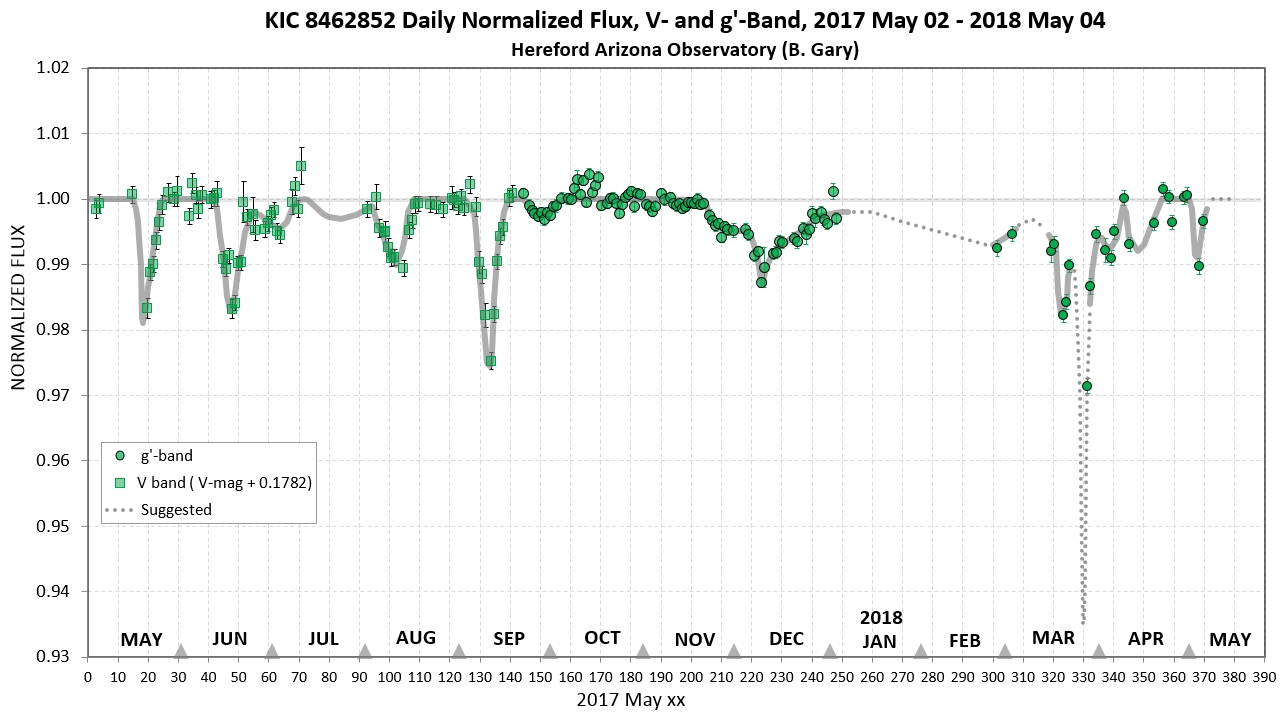
2 May 2017, to 4 May 2018: g′
Bruce Gary (HAO)

Prominent dimmings − start dates (est.):
- 14 May 2017 ("Elsie"; 2% dip)
- June 11 ("Celeste"; 2% dip)
- August 2 ("Skara Brae"; 1% dip)
- September 5 ("Angkor"; 2.3%; 3% dip)
- November 20 (unnamed; 1.25% dip)
- 16 March 2018 ("Caral-Supe"; 1%; 5% dip)
- March 24 ("Evangeline"; >5% dip)

On 20 May 2017, Boyajian and her colleagues reported, via The Astronomer's Telegram, on an ongoing dimming event (named "Elsie") which possibly began on 14 May 2017. It was detected by the Las Cumbres Observatory Global Telescope Network, specifically by its telescope in Maui (LCO Maui). This was verified by the Fairborn Observatory (part of the N2K Consortium) in Southern Arizona (and later by LCO Canary Islands). Further optical and infrared spectroscopy and photometry were urgently requested, given the short duration of these events, which may be measured in days or weeks. Observations from multiple observers globally were coordinated, including polarimetry. Furthermore, the independent SETI projects Breakthrough Listen and Near-InfraRed Optical SETI (NIROSETI), both at Lick Observatory, continue to monitor the star. By the end of the three-day dimming event, a dozen observatories had taken spectra, with some astronomers having dropped their own projects to provide telescope time and resources. More generally the astronomical community was described as having gone "mildly bananas" over the opportunity to collect data in real-time on the unique star. The 2% dip event was named "Elsie" (a homophone of "LC", in reference to Las Cumbres and light curve).

Initial spectra with FRODOSpec at the two-meter Liverpool Telescope showed no changes visible between a reference spectrum and this dip. Several observatories, however, including the twin Keck telescopes (HIRES) and numerous citizen science observatories, acquired spectra of the star, showing a dimming that had a complex shape, and initially had a pattern similar to the one at 759.75 days from the Kepler event 2, epoch 2 data. Observations were taken across the electromagnetic spectrum.

Evidence of a second dimming event (named "Celeste") was observed on 13–14 June 2017, which possibly began 11 June, by amateur astronomer Bruce L. Gary. While the light curve on 14–15 June indicated a possible recovery from the dimming event, the dimming continued to increase afterwards, and on 16 June, Boyajian wrote that the event was approaching a 2% dip in brightness.

A third prominent 1% dimming event (named "Skara Brae") was detected beginning 2 August 2017, and which recovered by 17 August.

A fourth prominent dimming event (named "Angkor") began 5 September 2017, and is, as of 16 September 2017, between 2.3% and 3% dimming event, making it the "deepest dip this year".

Another dimming event, amounting to a 0.3% dip, began around 21 September 2017, and completely recovered by 4 October 2017. (Note: Gary, Bruce L. (4 October 2017). "Hereford Arizona Observatory photometry observations of KIC 8462852 between 2 May and 4 October 2017". BruceGary.net. Archived from the original on 4 October 2017. Note: g′-band and r′-band dip depths (and shapes) may differ, with g′-band being more sensitive to dust cloud scattering due to its shorter wavelength (0.47 vs. 0.62 micron). For a reasonable particle size distribution (e.g., Hanson, 0.2 micron) the extinction cross section ratio would produce a depth at r′-band that is 0.57 × depth at g′-band. If g′-band depth is 0.3%, for example, depth at r′-band could be 0.17%. The 'Tabby Team' measurements (Fig. 3) at r′-band are compatible with that small dip depth. Incidentally, none of these shapes resemble exo-comet tail transits (as described by Rappaport et al, 2017); so the mystery of what's producing these week-timescale dips continues! Actually, long oval shapes are known to produce V-shaped dips (think of rings with a high inclination).)

On 10 October 2017, an increasing brightening, lasting about two weeks, of the starlight from KIC 8462852 (Tabby's Star) was noted by Bruce L. Gary of the Hereford Arizona Observatory and Boyajian. A possible explanation, involving a transiting brown dwarf in a 1,600-day eccentric orbit near KIC 8462852, a "drop feature" in dimness and predicted intervals of brightening, to account for the unusual fluctuating starlight events of KIC 8462852, has been proposed.

On about 20 November 2017, a fifth prominent dimming event began and had deepened to a depth of 0.44%; as of 16 December 2017, the event recovered, leveled off at dip bottom for 11 days, faded again, to a current total dimming depth of 1.25%, and was recovering again.

Dimming and brightening events of the star continue to be monitored; related light curves are updated and released frequently.

=== 2018 light fluctuations ===
The star was too close to the Sun's position in the sky from late December 2017 to mid February 2018 to be seen. Observations resumed in late February. A new series of dips began on 16 March 2018. By 18 March 2018, the star was down in brightness by more than 1% in g-band, according to Bruce L. Gary, and about 5% in r-band, making it the deepest dip observed since the Kepler Mission in 2013, according to Tabetha S. Boyajian. A second even deeper dip with a depth of >5% started on 24 March 2018, as confirmed by AAVSO observer John Hall. As of 27 March 2018, that second dip was recovering.

=== 2019 light fluctuations ===
The 2019 observing season began in mid-March, when the star reappeared after its yearly conjunction with the Sun.

The ground based observation campaign was supplemented by the Transiting Exoplanet Survey Satellite (TESS), which observed the star every 2 minutes between 18 July – 11 September 2019. It observed a 1.4% dip in brightness between 3–4 September 2019.

Between October 2019 and December 2019, at least seven separate dips were observed, the deepest of which had a depth of 2%. By the end of the observing season in early January 2020, the star had once again recovered in brightness. The total combined depth of the dips in 2019 was 11%, comparable to that seen in 2011 and 2013, but spread over a long time interval. This cluster of dips is roughly centered on the 17 October 2019 date predicted by Sacco et al. for a reappearance, given a 1,574-day (4.31-year) period, of orbiting material comprising the original "D800" dip.

== Luminosity ==
Observations of the luminosity of the star by the Kepler space telescope show small, frequent, non-periodic dips in brightness, along with two large recorded dips in brightness two years apart. The amplitude of the changes in the star's brightness, and the aperiodicity of the changes, mean that this star is of particular interest for astronomers. The star's changes in brightness are consistent with many small masses orbiting the star in "tight formation".

The first major dip, on 5 March 2011, reduced the star's brightness by up to 15%, and the next 726 days later (on 28 February 2013) by up to 22%. (A third dimming, around 8%, occurred 48 days later.) In comparison, a planet the size of Jupiter would only obscure a star of this size by 1%, indicating that whatever is blocking light during the star's major dips is not a planet, but rather something covering up to half the width of the star. Due to the failure of two of Kepler's reaction wheels, the star's predicted 750-day dip around February 2015 was not recorded. The light dips do not exhibit an obvious pattern.

In addition to the day-long dimmings, a study of a century's worth of photographic plates suggests that the star has gradually faded in 100 years (from c. 1890 to c. 1990) by about 20%, which would be unprecedented for any F-type main-sequence star. Teasing accurate magnitudes from long-term photographic archives is a complex procedure, however, requiring adjustment for equipment changes, and is strongly dependent on the choice of comparison stars. Another study, examining the same photographic plates, concluded that the possible century-long dimming was likely a data artifact, and not a real astrophysical event. Another study from plates between 1895 and 1995 found strong evidence that the star has not dimmed, but kept a constant flux within a few percent, except an 8% dip on 24 October 1978, resulting in a period of the putative occulter of 738 days.

A third study, using light measurements by the Kepler observatory over a four-year period, determined that Tabby's Star dimmed at about 0.34% per year before dimming more rapidly by about 2.5% in 200 days. It then returned to its previous slow fade rate. The same technique was used to study 193 stars in its vicinity and 355 stars similar in size and composition to Tabby's Star. None of these stars exhibited such dimming.

In 2018, a possible 1,574-day (4.31-year) periodicity in dimming of the star was reported.

== Stellar companion ==
A red dwarf stellar companion at projected separation 880±10 AU from Tabby's Star was confirmed to be comoving in 2021. For comparison, this is around 180 times the orbit of Jupiter, around 30 times the orbit of Neptune, or around 5.3 times the distance to Voyager 1 as of January 2025.

== Hypotheses ==
Originally, and until Kohler's work of 2017, it was thought that, based on the spectrum and stellar type of Tabby's Star, its changes in brightness could not be attributed to intrinsic variability. Consequently, a few hypotheses have been proposed involving material orbiting the star and blocking its light, although none of these fully fit the observed data.

Some of the proposed explanations involve interstellar dust, a series of giant planets with very large ring structures, a recently captured asteroid field, the system undergoing Late Heavy Bombardment, and an artificial megastructure orbiting the star.

By 2018, the leading hypothesis was that the "missing" heat flux involved in the star's dimming could be stored within the star's interior. Such variations in luminosity might arise from a number of mechanisms affecting the efficiency of heat transport inside the star.

However, in September 2019, astronomers reported that the observed dimmings of Tabby's Star may have been produced by fragments resulting from the disruption of an orphaned exomoon.

=== Circumstellar dust ring ===
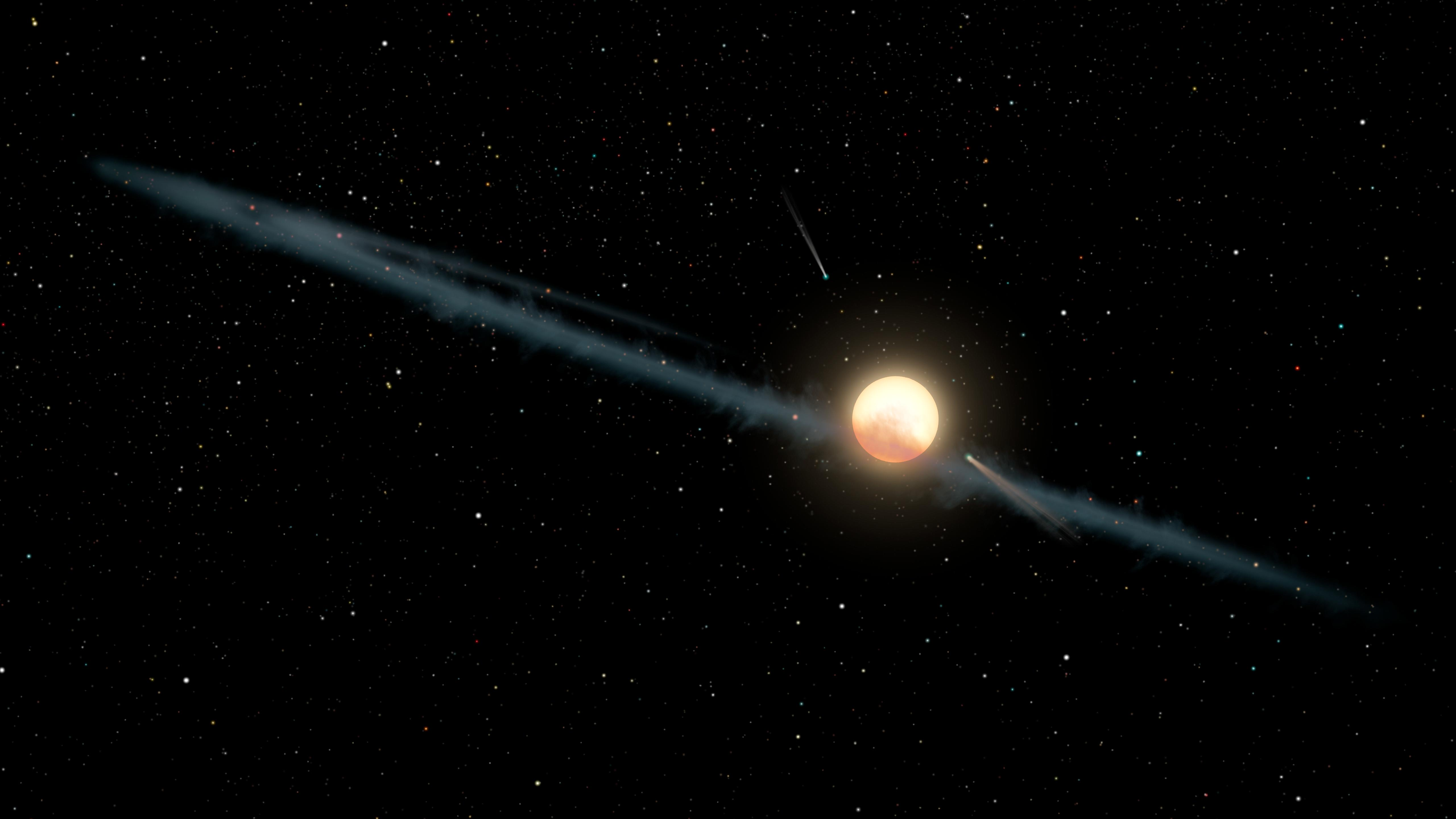
Artist's concept of an "uneven ring of dust" orbiting Tabby's Star

Meng et al. (2017) suggested that, based on observational data of Tabby's Star from the Swift Gamma-Ray Burst Mission, Spitzer Space Telescope, and Belgian AstroLAB IRIS Observatory, only "microscopic fine-dust screens", originating from "circumstellar material", are able to disperse the starlight in the way detected in their measurements. Based on these studies, on 4 October 2017, NASA reported that the unusual dimming events of Tabby's Star are due to an "uneven ring of dust" orbiting the star. Although the explanation of a significant amount of small particles orbiting the star regards "long-term fading" as noted by Meng, the explanation also seems consistent with the week-long fadings found by amateur astronomer Bruce L. Gary and the Tabby Team, coordinated by astronomer Tabetha S. Boyajian, in more recent dimming events. A related, but more sophisticated, explanation of dimming events, involving a transiting "brown dwarf" in a 1600-day eccentric orbit near Tabby's Star, a "drop feature" in dimness, and predicted intervals of "brightening", has been proposed. Dimming and brightening events of Tabby's Star continue to be monitored; related light curves are updated and released frequently.

Nonetheless, data similar to that observed for Tabby's Star, along with supporting data from the Chandra X-ray Observatory, were found with dust debris orbiting WD 1145+017, a white dwarf that also has unusual light curve fluctuations. Further, the highly variable star RZ Piscium, which brightens and dims erratically, has been found to emit excessive infrared radiation, suggesting that the star is surrounded by large amounts of gas and dust, possibly resulting from the destruction of local planets.

=== A cloud of disintegrating comets ===
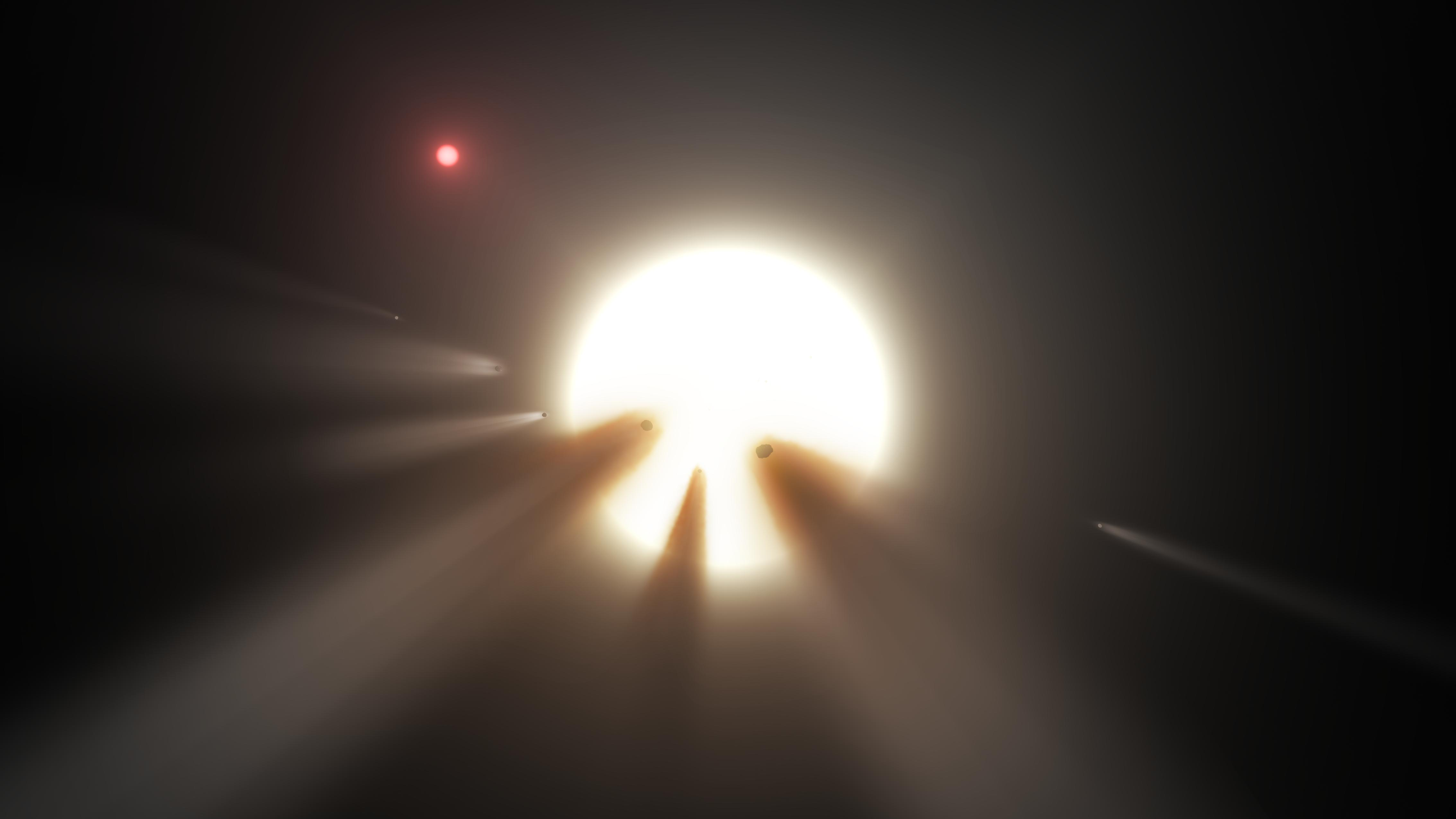
Artist's impression of an orbiting swarm of dusty comet fragments

One proposed explanation for the reduction in light is that it is due to a cloud of disintegrating comets orbiting the star elliptically. This scenario would assume that a planetary system around Tabby's Star has something similar to the Oort cloud and that gravity from a nearby star caused comets from said cloud to fall closer into the system, thereby obstructing the spectra of Tabby's Star. Evidence supporting this hypothesis includes an M-type red dwarf within 132 billion kilometers (885 AU) of Tabby's Star. The notion that disturbed comets from such a cloud could exist in high enough numbers to obscure 22% of the star's observed luminosity has been doubted. The smooth shallow ingress and sharp egress of some dimming events, as well as some symmetric triple dips, are difficult to explain with the comet scenario. Instead, a few asteroid-like bodies embedded in a dust cloud may better explain the star's light curve.

Submillimetre-wavelength observations searching for farther-out cold dust in an asteroid belt akin to the Sun's Kuiper Belt suggest that a distant "catastrophic" planetary disruption explanation is unlikely; the possibility of a disrupted asteroid belt scattering comets into the inner system is still to be determined.

=== Younger star with coalescing material around it ===
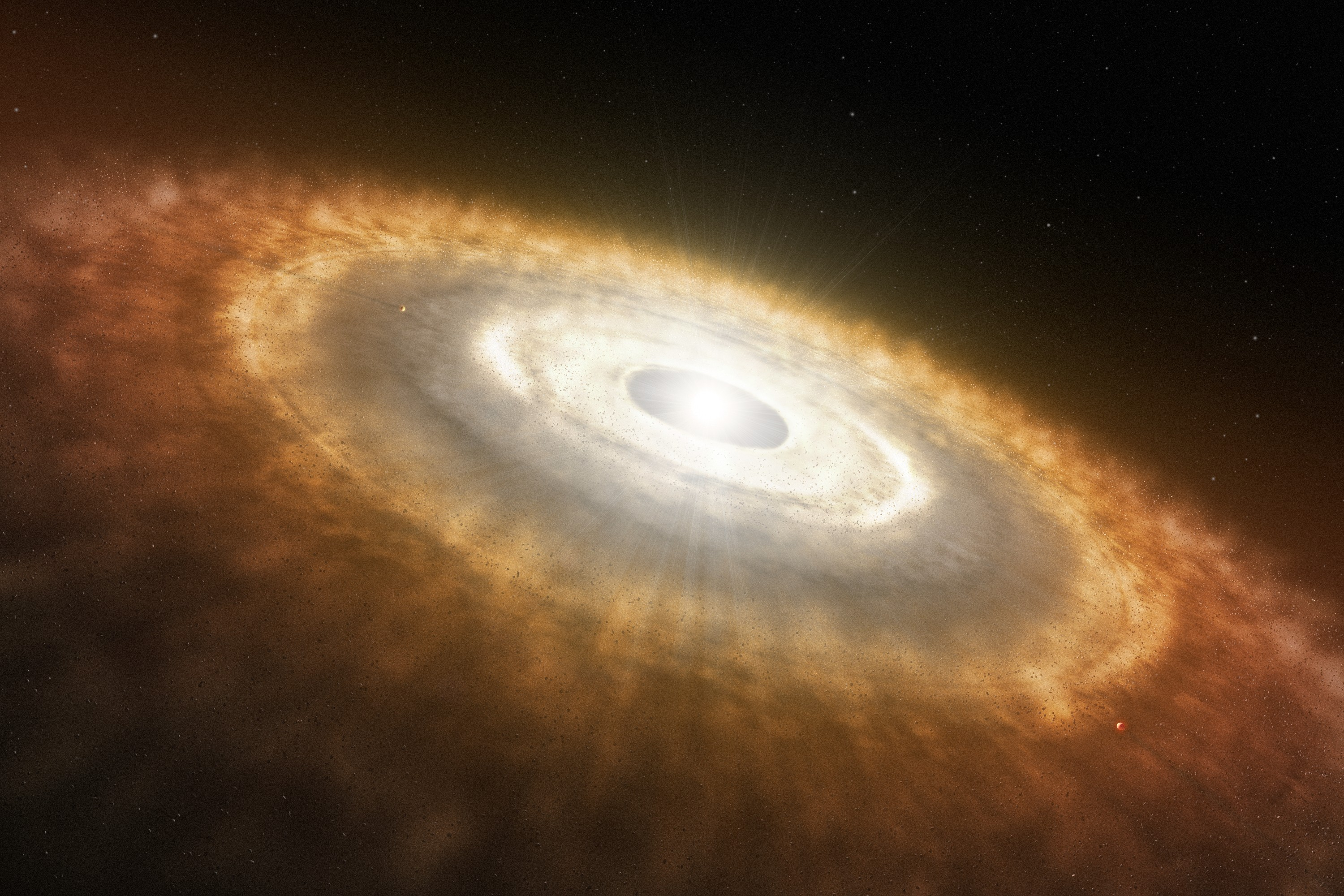
Artist's impression of a young star with coalescing material around it

Astronomer Jason T. Wright and others who have studied Tabby's Star have suggested that if the star is younger than its position and speed would suggest, then it may still have coalescing material around it.

A 0.8–4.2-micrometer spectroscopic study of the system using the NASA Infrared Telescope Facility (NASA IRTF) found no evidence for coalescing material within a few astronomical units of the mature central star.

=== Planetary debris field ===
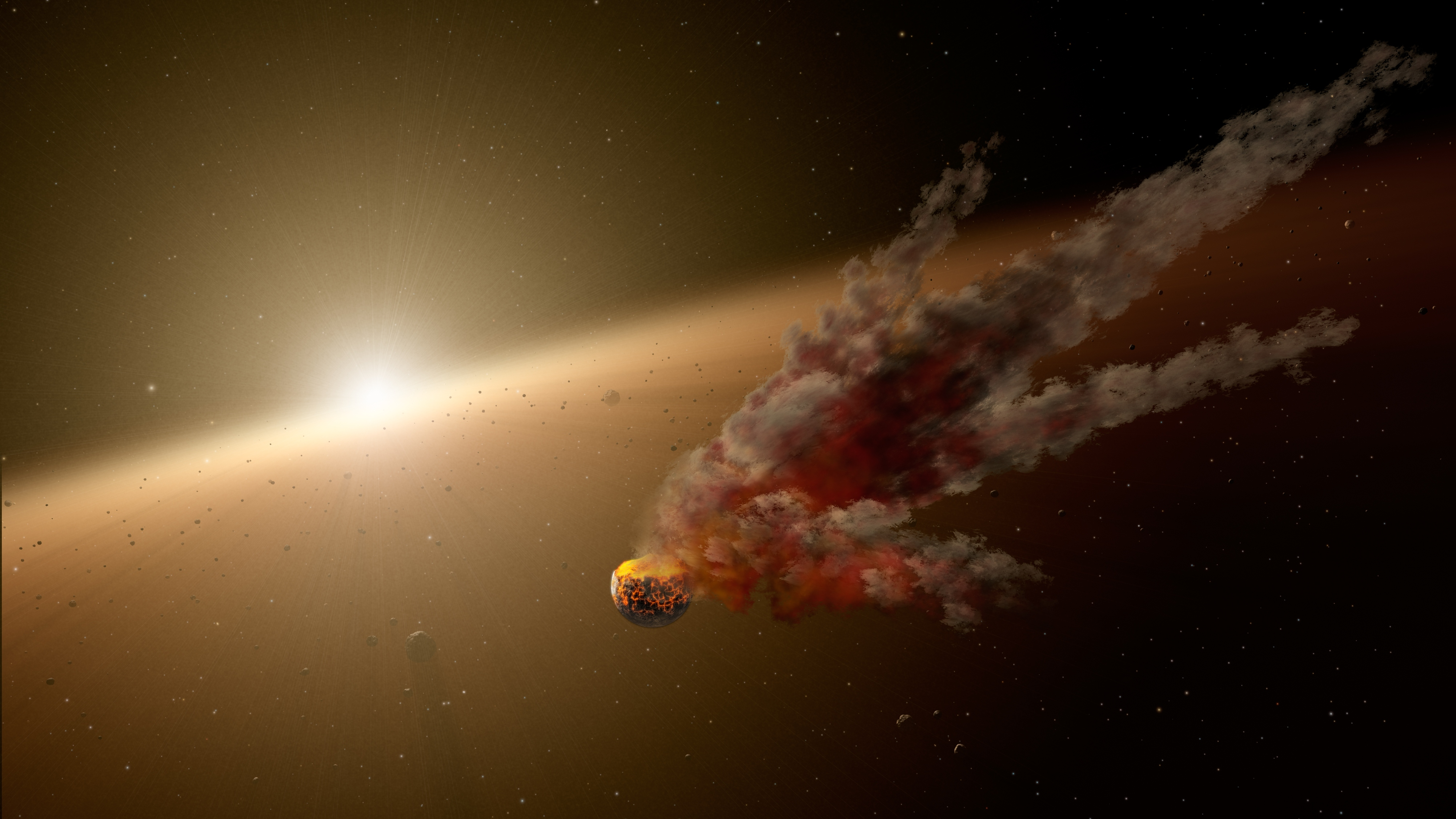
Artist's impression of a massive collision with a proto-planet

High-resolution spectroscopy and imaging observations have also been made, as well as spectral energy distribution analyses using the Nordic Optical Telescope in Spain. A massive collision scenario would create warm dust that glows in infrared wavelengths, but there is no observed excess infrared energy, ruling out massive planetary collision debris. Other researchers think the planetary debris field explanation is unlikely, given the very low probability that Kepler would ever witness such an event due to the rarity of collisions of such size.

As with the possibility of coalescing material around the star, spectroscopic studies using the NASA IRTF found no evidence for hot close-in dust or circumstellar matter from an evaporating or exploding planet within a few astronomical units of the central star. Similarly, a study of past infrared data from NASA's Spitzer Space Telescope and Wide-field Infrared Survey Explorer found no evidence for an excess of infrared emission from the star, which would have been an indicator of warm dust grains that could have come from catastrophic collisions of meteors or planets in the system. This absence of emission supports the hypothesis that a swarm of cold comets on an unusually eccentric orbit could be responsible for the star's unique light curve, but more studies are needed.

=== Consumption of a planet ===
In December 2016, a team of researchers proposed that Tabby's Star swallowed a planet, causing a temporary and unobserved increase in brightness due to the release of gravitational energy. As the planet fell into its star, it could have been ripped apart or had its moons stripped away, leaving clouds of debris orbiting the star in eccentric orbits. Planetary debris still in orbit around the star would then explain its observed drops in intensity. Additionally, the researchers suggest that the consumed planet could have caused the star to increase in brightness up to 10,000 years ago, and its stellar flux is now returning to the normal state.

=== Large planet with oscillating rings ===
Sucerquia et al. (2017) suggested that a large planet with oscillating rings may help explain the unusual dimmings associated with Tabby's Star.

=== Large ringed planet followed by Trojan swarms ===
Ballesteros et al. (2017) proposed a large, ringed planet trailed by a swarm of Trojan asteroids in its L5 Lagrangian point, and estimated an orbit that predicts another event in early 2021 due to the leading Trojans followed by another transit of the hypothetical planet in 2023. The model suggests a planet with a radius of 4.7 Jupiter radii, large for a planet (unless very young). An early red dwarf of about 0.5 R_{☉} would be easily seen in infrared. The current radial velocity observations available (four runs at σ_{v} ≈ 400 m/s) hardly constrain the model, but new radial velocity measurements would greatly reduce the uncertainty. The model predicts a discrete and short-lived event for the May 2017 dimming episode, corresponding to the secondary eclipse of the planet passing behind KIC 8246852, with about a 3% decrease in the stellar flux with a transit time of about 2 days. If this is the cause of the May 2017 event, the planet's orbital period is more precisely estimated as 12.41 years with a semi-major axis of 5.9 AU.

=== Intrinsic luminosity variations ===
The reddening observed during the deep dimming events of Tabby's Star is consistent with cooling of its photosphere. It does not require obscuration by dust. Such cooling could be produced by a decreased efficiency of heat transport caused e.g. by decreased effectiveness of convection due to the star's strong differential rotation, or by changes in its modes of heat transport if it is near the transition between radiative and convective heat transport. The "missing" heat flux is stored as a small increase of internal and potential energy.

The possible location of this early F star near the boundary between radiative and convective transport seems to be supported by the finding that the star's observed brightness variations appear to fit the "avalanche statistics" known to occur in a system close to a phase-transition. "Avalanche statistics" with a self-similar or power-law spectrum are a universal property of complex dynamical systems operating close to a phase transition or bifurcation point between two different types of dynamical behavior. Such close-to-critical systems are often observed to exhibit behavior that is intermediate between "order" and "chaos". Three other stars in the Kepler Input Catalog likewise exhibit similar "avalanche statistics" in their brightness variations, and all three are known to be magnetically active. It has been conjectured that stellar magnetism may be involved in Tabby's Star.

=== An artificial megastructure ===
Artist's impression of a Dyson swarm

Some astronomers have speculated that the objects eclipsing Tabby's Star could be parts of a megastructure made by an alien civilization, such as a Dyson swarm, a hypothetical structure that an advanced civilization might build around a star to intercept some of its light for their energy needs. According to Steinn Sigurðsson, the megastructure hypothesis is implausible and disfavored by Occam's razor and fails to sufficiently explain the dimming. He says that it remains a valid subject for scientific investigation, however, because it is a falsifiable hypothesis. Due to extensive media coverage on this matter, Tabby's Star has been compared by Kepler's Steve Howell to KIC 4150611, a star with an odd light curve that was shown, after years of research, to be a part of a five-star system. The likelihood of extraterrestrial intelligence being the cause of the dimming is purely speculative; however, the star remains an outstanding SETI target because natural explanations have yet to fully explain the dimming phenomenon. The latest results have ruled out explanations involving only opaque objects such as stars, planets, swarms of asteroids, or alien megastructures.

=== Exomoons ===
Two papers published in summer 2019 offered plausible scientific scenarios involving large moons being stripped from their planets. Numerical simulations were performed of the migration of gas giant planets, and their large gaseous moons, during the first few hundred million years after the formation of the planetary system. In approximately 50% of the cases, the results produce a scenario where the moon is freed from its parent planet and its orbit evolves to produce a light curve similar to that of Tabby's Star.

== Follow-up studies ==
As of 2015, numerous optical telescopes were monitoring Tabby's Star in anticipation of another multi-day dimming event, with planned follow-up observations of a dimming event using large telescopes equipped with spectrographs to determine if the eclipsing mass is a solid object, or composed of dust or gas. Additional follow-up observations may involve the ground-based Green Bank Telescope, the Very Large Array Radio Telescope, and future orbital telescopes dedicated to exoplanetology such as the Nancy Grace Roman Space Telescope, TESS, and PLATO.

In 2016, a Kickstarter fund-raising campaign was led by Tabetha Boyajian, the lead author of the initial study on the star's anomalous light curve. The project proposed to use the Las Cumbres Observatory Global Telescope Network for continuous monitoring of the star. The campaign raised over US$100,000, enough for one year of telescope time. Furthermore, as of 2016, more than fifty amateur astronomers working under the aegis of the American Association of Variable Star Observers were providing effectively full coverage since AAVSO's alert about the star in October 2015, namely a nearly continuous photometric record. In a study published in January 2018, Boyajian et al. reported that whatever is blocking Tabby's Star filters different wavelengths of light differently, so it cannot be an opaque object. They concluded that it is most likely space dust.

In December 2018, a search for laser light emissions from Tabby's Star was carried out using the Automated Planet Finder (APF), which is sensitive enough to detect a 24 MW laser at this distance. Although a number of candidates were identified, further analysis showed that they are coming from the Earth and not from the star.

=== SETI results ===
In October 2015, the SETI Institute used the Allen Telescope Array to look for radio emissions from possible intelligent extraterrestrial life in the vicinity of the star. After an initial two-week survey, the SETI Institute reported that it found no evidence of technology-related radio signals from the star system. No narrowband radio signals were found at a level of 180–300 Jy in a 1 Hz channel, or medium-band signals above 10 Jy in a 100 kHz channel.

In 2016, the VERITAS gamma-ray observatory was used to search for ultra-fast optical transients from astronomical objects, with astronomers developing an efficient method sensitive to nanosecond pulses with fluxes as low as about one photon per square meter. This technique was applied on archival observations of Tabby's Star from 2009 to 2015, but no emissions were detected.

In May 2017, a related search, based on laser light emissions, was reported, with no evidence found for technology-related signals from Tabby's Star.

In September 2017, some SETI@Home workunits were created based on a previous RF survey of the region around this star. This was coupled with a doubling in the size of SETI@Home workunits, so the workunits related to this region will probably be the first workunits to have less issues with quantization noise.

=== EPIC 204278916 ===
A star called EPIC 204278916, as well as some other young stellar objects, have been observed to exhibit dips with some similarities to those observed in Tabby's Star. They differ in several respects, however. EPIC 204278916 shows much deeper dips than Tabby's Star, and they are grouped over a shorter period, whereas the dips at Tabby's Star are spread out over several years. Furthermore, EPIC 204278916 is surrounded by a proto-stellar disc, whereas Tabby's Star appears to be a normal F-type star displaying no evidence of a disc.

=== Other stars ===
An overall study of 21 other similar stars was presented in 2019.

== Possible companion ==
A 2026 study analysing observations by the Transiting Exoplanet Survey Satellite found evidence for a transiting object. Combined with radial velocity observations, they found tentative evidence for a mass of 9.4+4.9
−4.1 M_{J}, which would straddle between the planet and brown dwarf boundaries. If real, it would be orbiting with a period of 1,200 days (3.3 years), following a nearly circular orbit with an eccentricity of 0.09 and a semi-major axis of 2.35±0.17 au. The estimated equilibrium temperature is 268 ± 13 K (−5.1 ± 13.0 °C; 22.7 ± 23.4 °F). More observations are needed to confirm the object.

The Tabby's Star planetary system
Companion (in order from star)	Mass	Semimajor axis (AU)	Orbital period (days)	Eccentricity	Inclination (°)	Radius
(unconfirmed)	9.4+4.9 −4.1 M_{J}	2.35±0.17	1,211+89 −78	0.09±0.05	~90°	1.7±0.1 R_{J}

== Light curve gallery ==
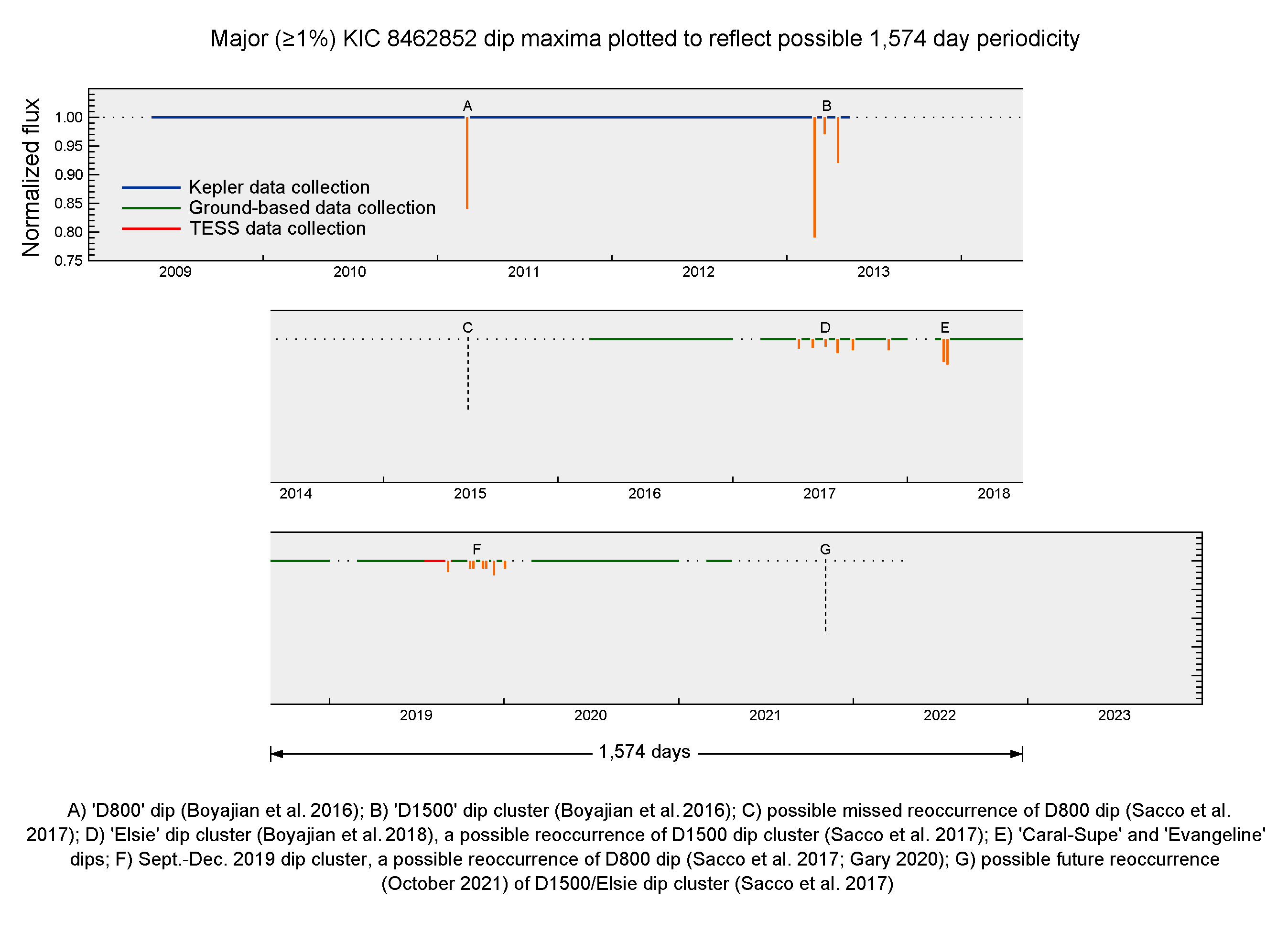
Consolidated plot of major (>= 1%) dimmings (3 April 2021)
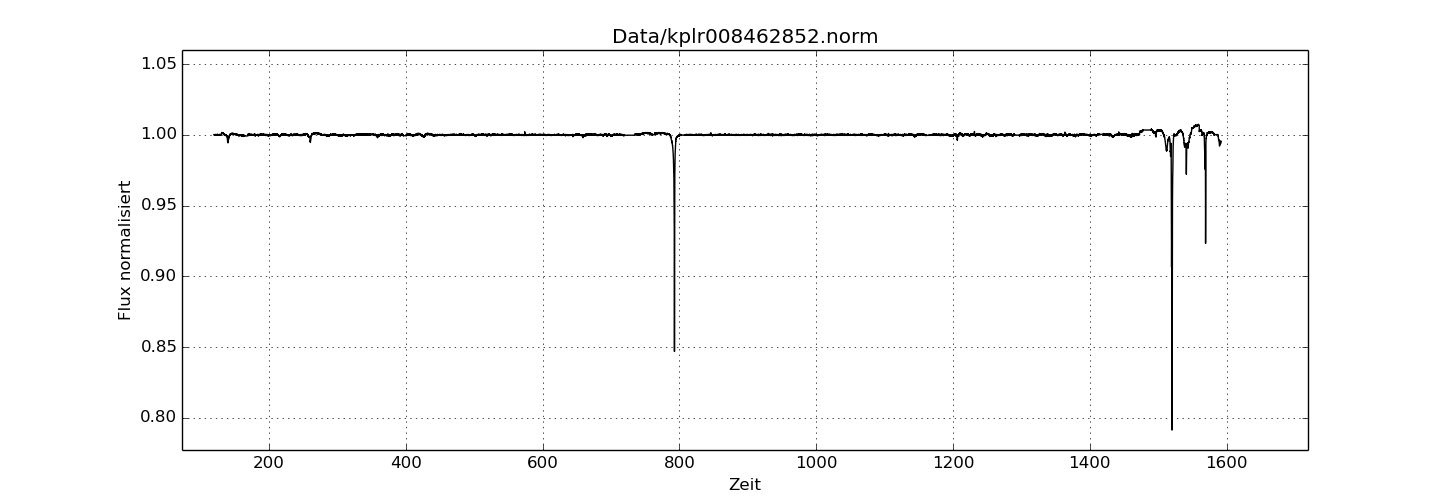
All light curve data − December 2009 to May 2013, scan days 0066 to 1587 (Kepler)

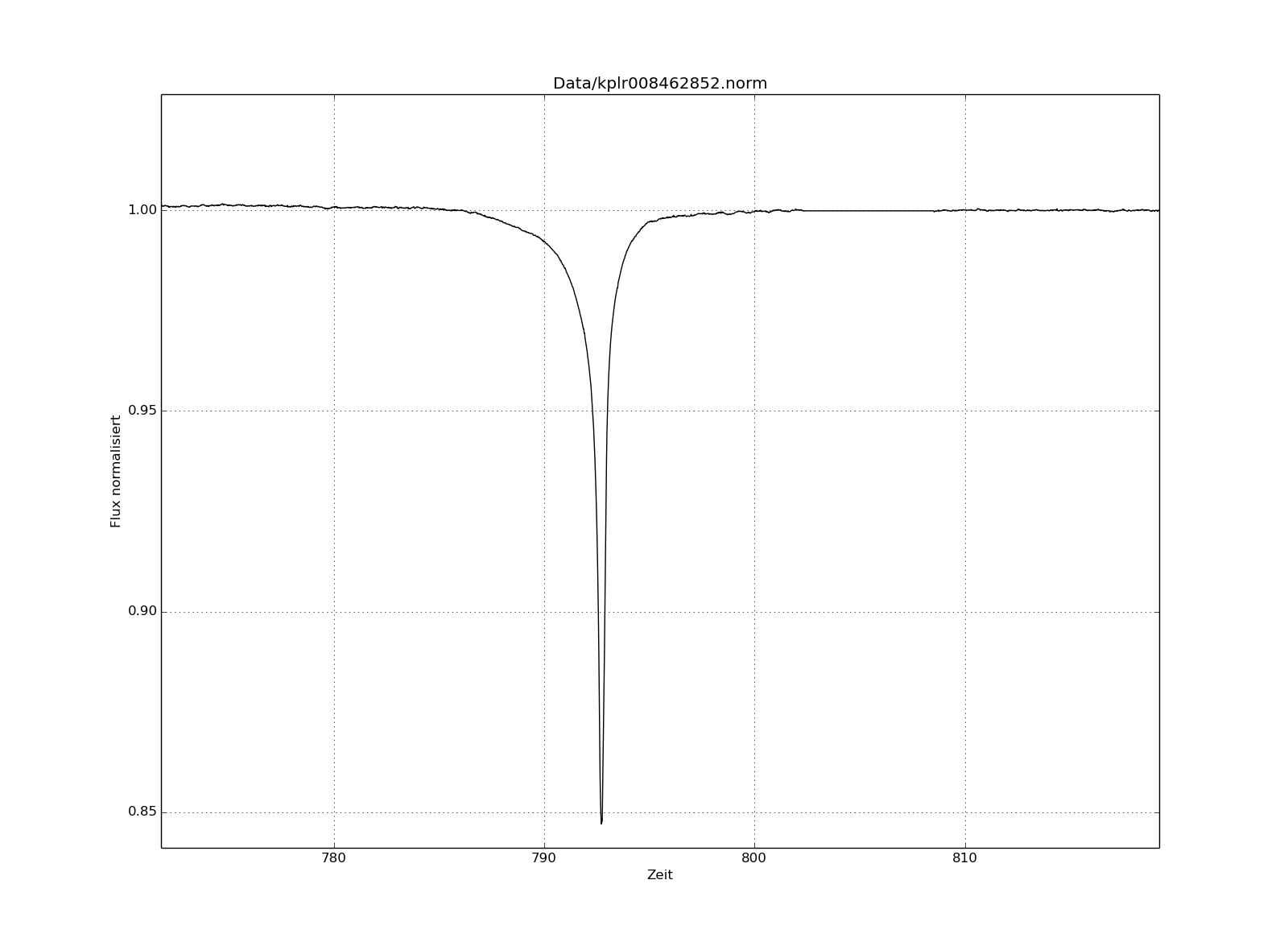
5 March 2011 − day 792
15% max dip (Kepler)

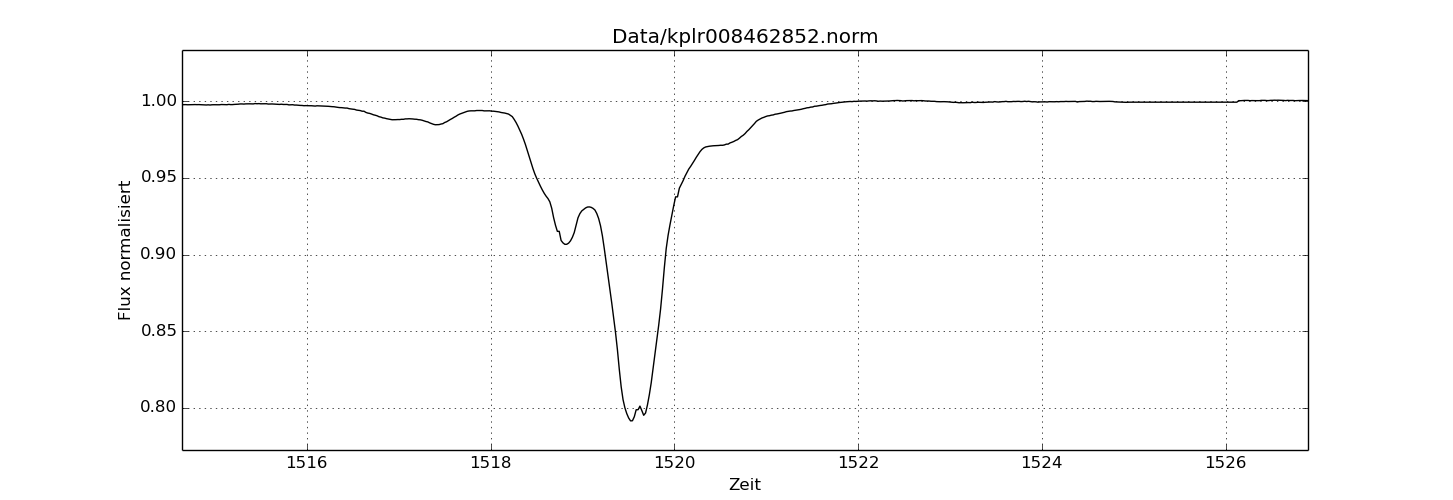
28 February 2013 − day 1519
22% max dip (Kepler)

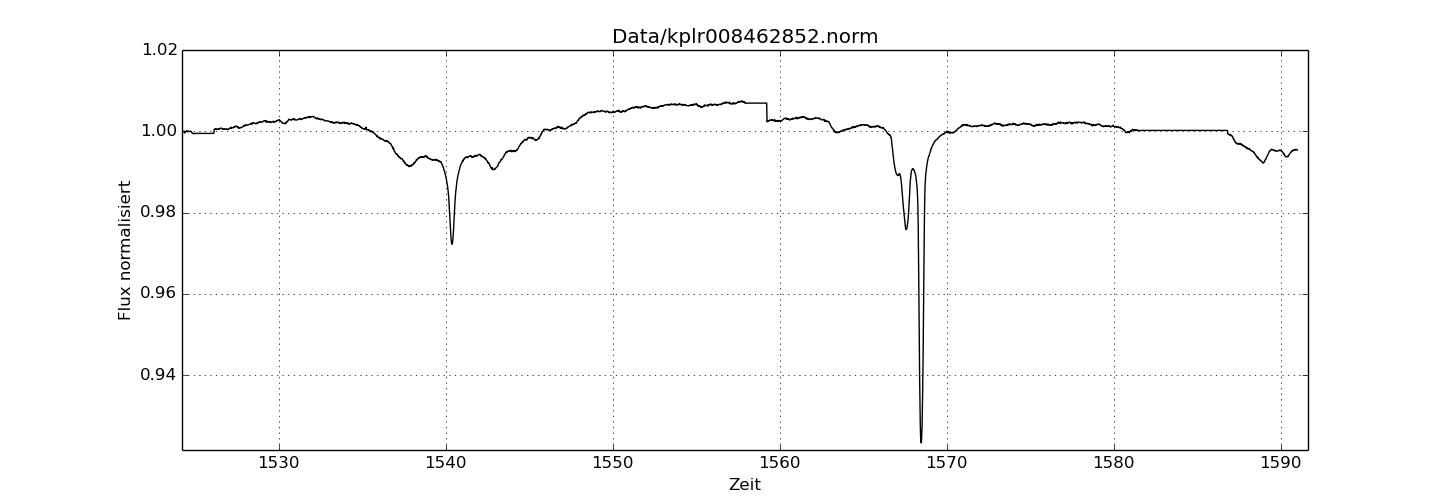
17 April 2013 − day 1568
8% max dip (Kepler)

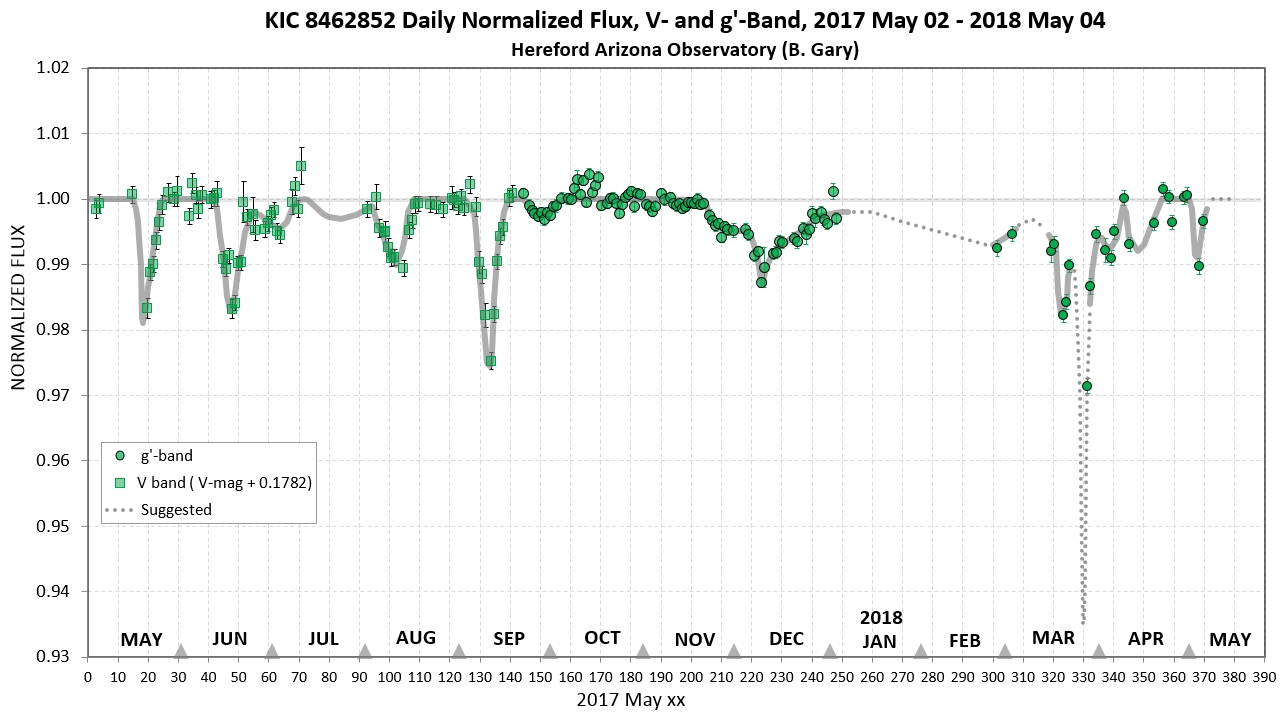
One-year light curve − up to 4 May 2018 (HAO)

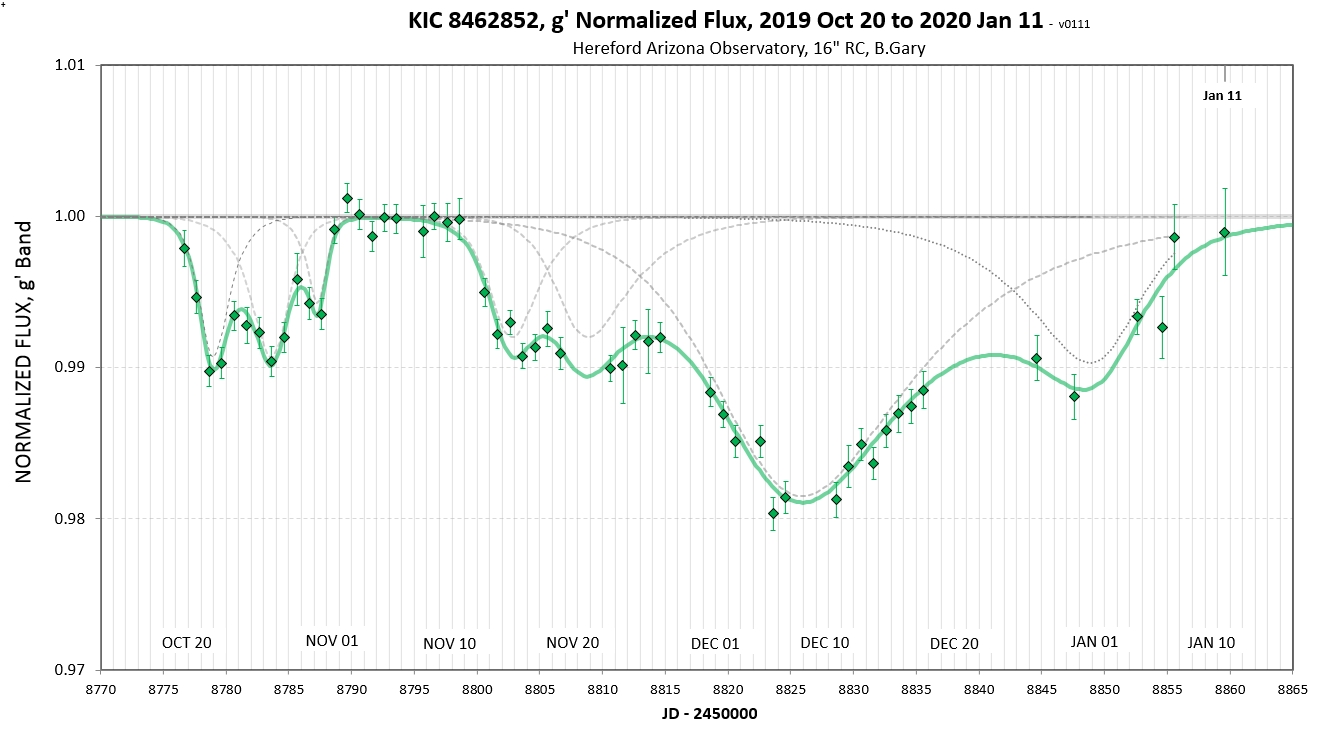
Light curve between 10 October 2019 and 11 January 2020 (HAO)

== See also ==
- Disrupted planet
- Tidally detached exomoon
- List of stars that have unusual dimming periods
- Stars named after people
