= Hereford Arizona Observatory =

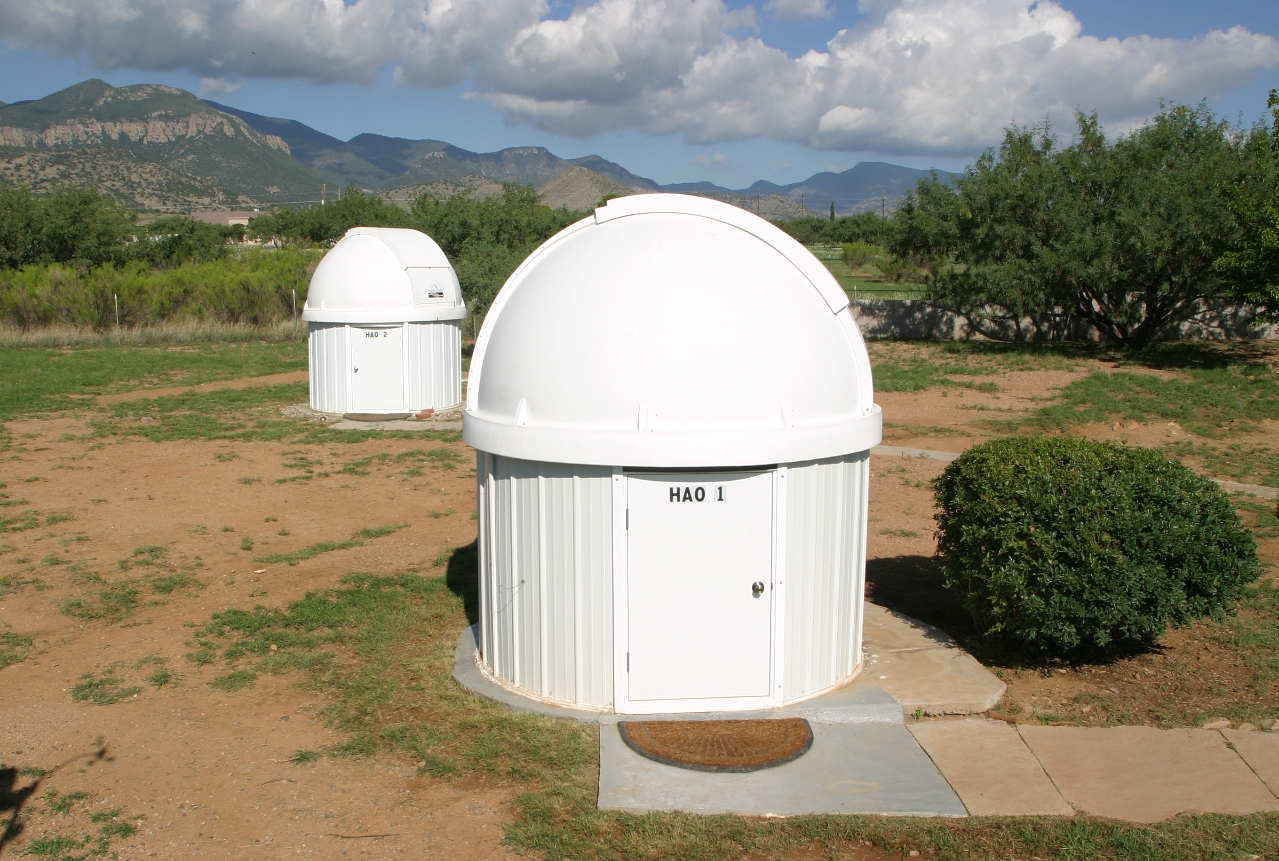
- Hereford Arizona Observatory (HAO); HAO#1 and HAO#2.
- Organization: Bruce L. Gary
- Observatory code: G95
- Location: Arizona
- Coordinates: 31°27′08″N 110°14′16″W
- Altitude: 4,670 ft (1,420 m)
- Website: www.brucegary.net/HAO/
- Commercial telescopes: Celestron CPC 1100; Meade LX200
- Related media on Commons

Hereford Arizona Observatory (HAO), IAU-code G95, is an astronomical observatory, owned and operated by amateur astronomer Bruce L. Gary. Observational studies of unusual starlight fluctuations in Tabby's Star (KIC 8462852) and WD 1145+017 are recent interests.

HAO consists of two telescopes, in two separate observatory installations: HAO#1 (contains a Celestron CPC 1100, 11-inch Schmidt-Cassegrain telescope on an equatorial mount) and HAO#2 (contains an Astro-Tech Ritchey–Chrétien, 16-inch telescope on an equatorial mount).

The observatory is located in Arizona about 130 km (80 mi) southeast of Tucson and about 11 km (7 mi) north of the Mexican border. Coordinates are at the following: North Latitude +31:27:08 and West Longitude 110:14:16, at an altitude of 1,423 m (4,670 ft).

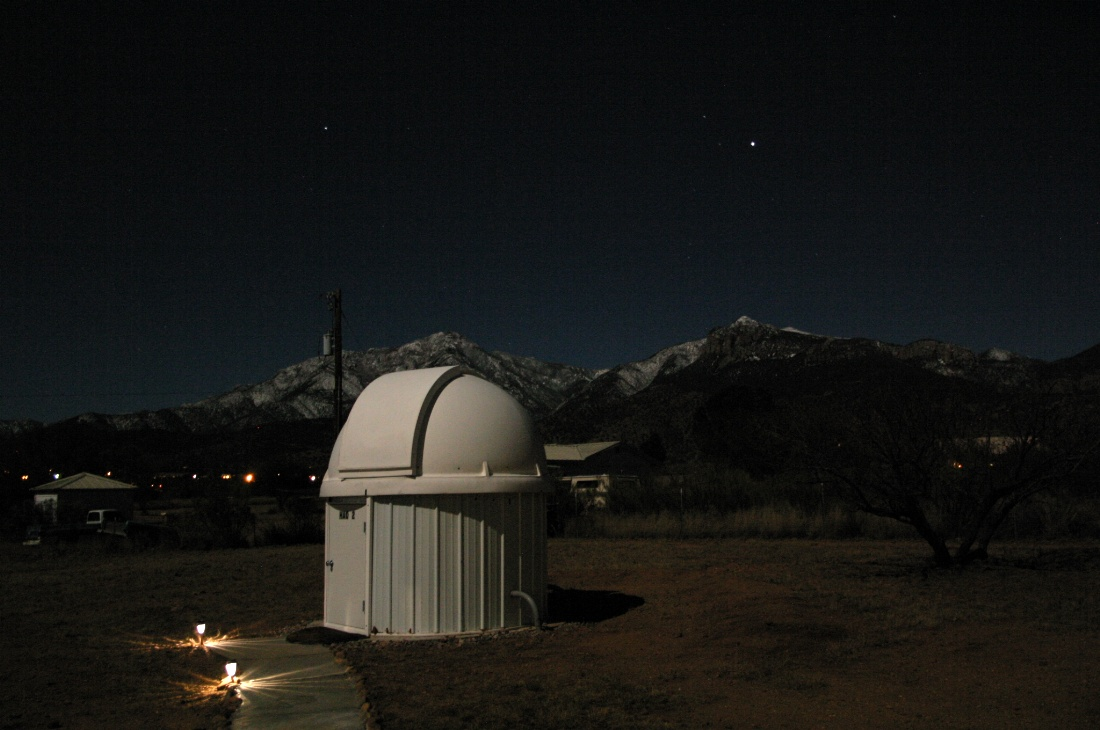
HAO#2 lit by a full moon with Venus setting behind mountains at 2,900 m (9,500 ft) altitude.

== Gallery ==
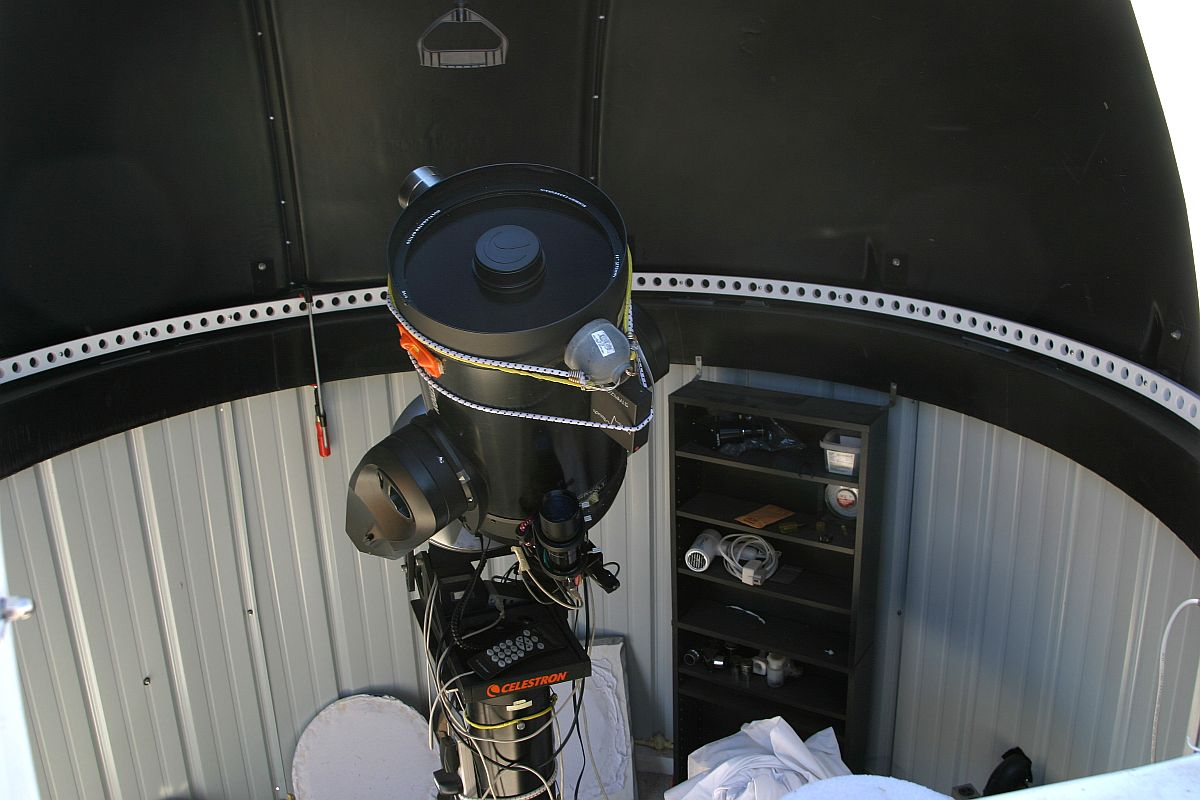
HAO#1 − Celestron 11-inch CPC-1100 telescope

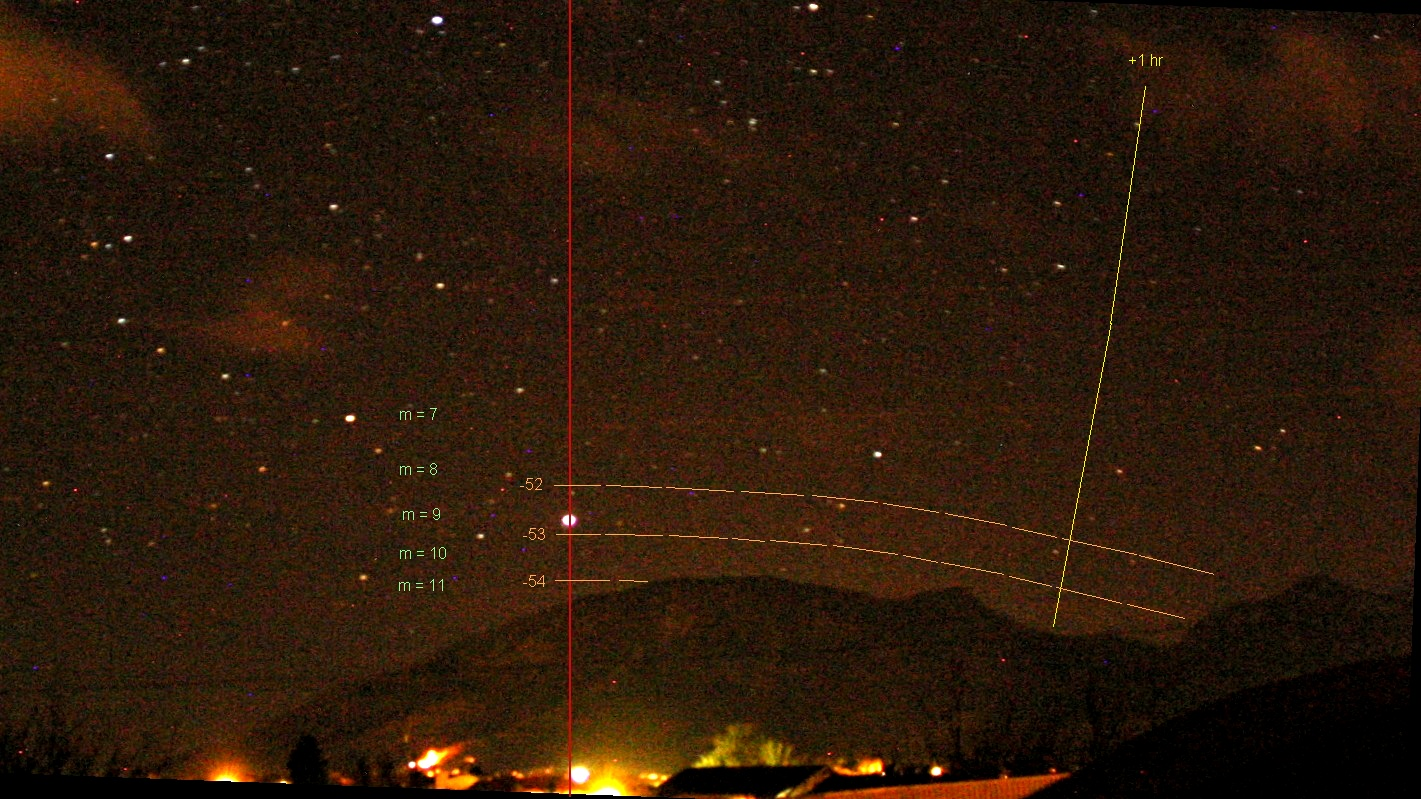
HAO view of the southern horizon − mountains are at 4.0 deg elevation on the meridian (vertical red line) − star Canopus (declination -52.7 deg) is transiting.

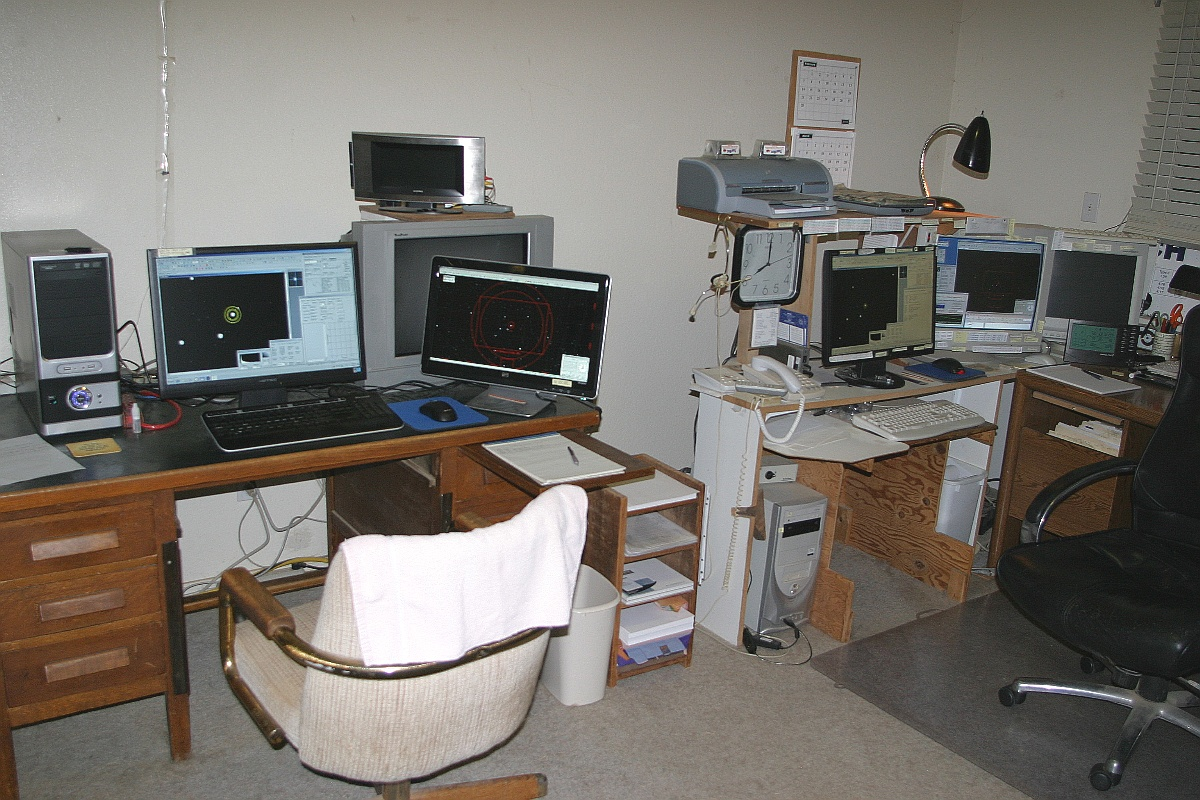
HAO control room − the Celestron-11 telescope is managed by a dedicated computer on the left; the Meade-14 by one on the right.

== See also ==
- List of astronomical observatories
- List of observatory codes
- Tabby's Star (KIC 8462852) − oddly dimming star
- WD 1145+017 - star destroying planetesimal, producing a dusty disk
