= Kepler-19 =

Star in the constellation Lyra

Observation data Epoch J2000 Equinox ICRS
- Constellation: Lyra
- Right ascension: 19^{h} 21^{m} 40.99950^{s}
- Declination: +37° 51′ 06.4373″
- Apparent magnitude (V): 12.04

Astrometry
| Radial velocity (R_{v}) | −11.36±0.53 km/s |
| Proper motion (μ) | RA: 25.349 mas/yr Dec.: −30.792 mas/yr |
| Parallax (π) | 4.5296±0.0087 mas |
| Distance | 720 ± 1 ly (220.8 ± 0.4 pc) |

Details
| Mass | 0.936±0.04 M_{☉} |
| Radius | 0.859±0.018 R_{☉} |
| Surface gravity (log g) | 4.54 cgs |
| Temperature | 5541±60 K |
| Metallicity [Fe/H] | −0.13±0.06 dex |
| Rotational velocity (v sin i) | 1.8±0.5 km/s |
| Age | 1.9±1.7 Gyr |

Other designations
- KIC 2571238, KOI-84, TYC 3134-1549-1, GSC 03134-01549, 2MASS J19214099+3751064, Gaia DR2 2051106987063242880

Database references
| SIMBAD | data |
| Exoplanet Archive | data |
| KIC | data |

Kepler-19 (TYC 3134-1549-1, 2MASS J19214099+3751064, GSC 03134-01549, KOI-84) is a G7V star that is host to three known planets - Kepler-19b, Kepler-19c, and Kepler-19d. It is located about 720 light-years (220 parsecs) away in the constellation Lyra, five arcminutes northwest of the much more distant open cluster NGC 6791.

== Planetary system ==
There are three known planets in the Kepler-19 planetary system. Planet b was discovered by the transit method, c by transit-timing variations and d by radial velocity measurements.

The Kepler-19 planetary system
| Companion (in order from star) | Mass | Semimajor axis (AU) | Orbital period (days) | Eccentricity | Inclination (°) | Radius |
|---|---|---|---|---|---|---|
| b | 8.4+1.6 −1.5 M_{🜨} | 0.0846±0.0012 | 9.2869900 | 0.12±0.02 | 89.94+0.06 −0.44 | 2.209±0.048 R_{🜨} |
| c | 13.1±2.7 M_{🜨} | — | 28.731+0.012 −0.005 | 0.21+0.05 −0.07 | — | — |
| d | 22.5+1.2 −5.6 M_{🜨} | — | 62.95+0.04 −0.30 | 0.05+0.16 −0.01 | — | — |
