= Kepler-61 =

K-type main sequence star in the constellation Cygnus

Observation data Epoch J2000 Equinox ICRS
- Constellation: Cygnus
- Right ascension: 19^{h} 41^{m} 13.0815^{s}
- Declination: +42° 28′ 30.984″
- Apparent magnitude (V): 15.3

Characteristics
- Evolutionary stage: Main sequence
- Spectral type: K7V

Astrometry
Proper motion (μ)	RA: −2.066(50) mas/yr Dec.: 10.687(52) mas/yr
Parallax (π)	2.9296±0.0418 mas
Distance	1,110 ± 20 ly (341 ± 5 pc)

Details
Mass	0.635±0.037 M_{☉}
Radius	0.62±0.03 R_{☉}
Luminosity	0.09 L_{☉}
Temperature	4,017+49 −150 K
Metallicity [Fe/H]	0.03±0.14 dex
Rotation	35.078±0.924 days
Age	>1 Gyr

Other designations
- KIC 6960913, KOI-1361

Database references
SIMBAD	data

Kepler-61 is a K-type main-sequence star approximately 1,100 light years from Earth in the constellation Cygnus. It is located within the field of vision of the Kepler spacecraft, the satellite that NASA's Kepler Mission used to detect planets that may be transiting their stars. On April 24, 2013 it was announced that the star has an extrasolar planet (a super-Earth) orbiting in the inner edge of the habitable zone, named Kepler-61b.

== Nomenclature and history ==
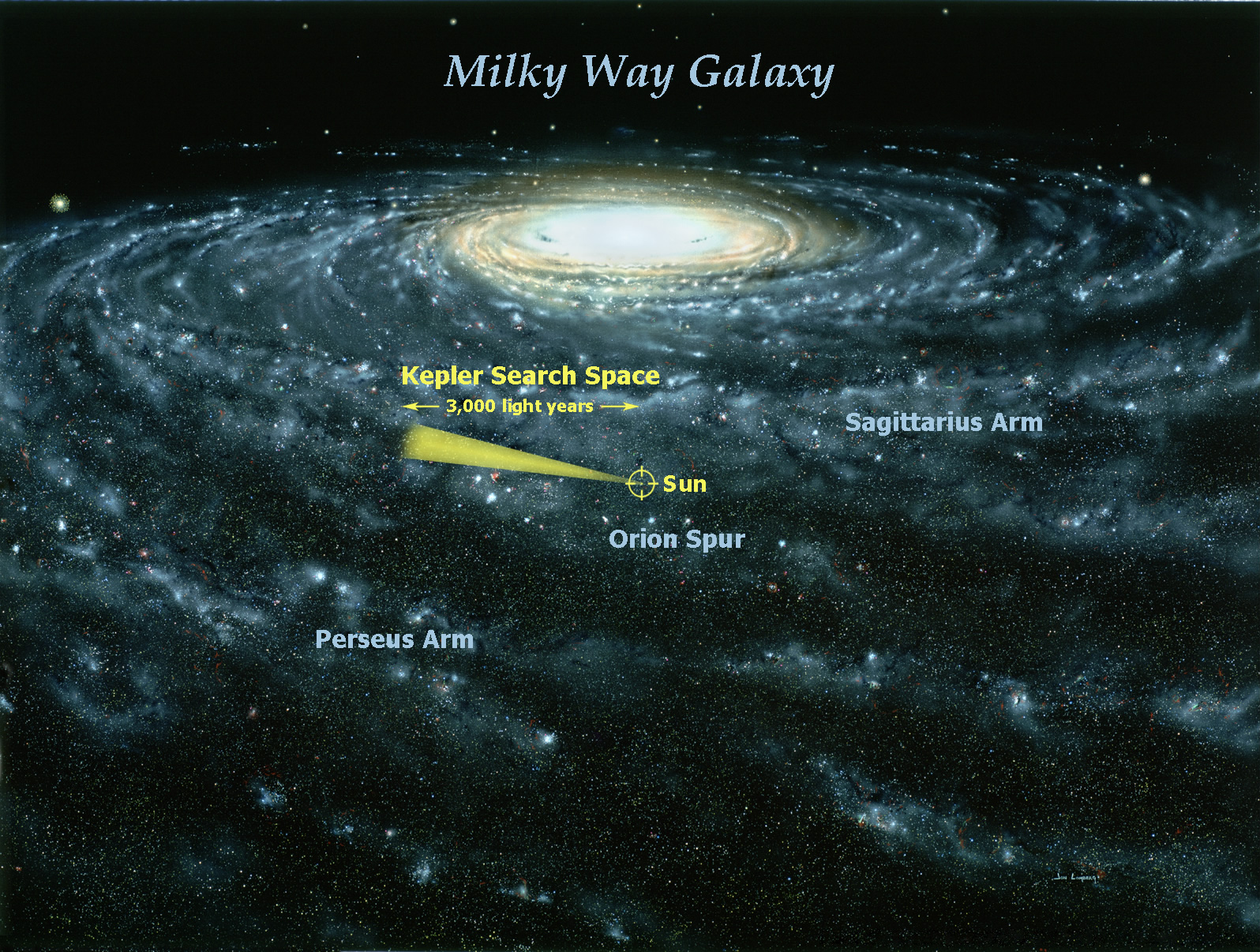
The Kepler Space Telescope search volume, in the context of the Milky Way Galaxy.

Prior to Kepler observation, Kepler-61 had the 2MASS catalogue number 2MASS J19411308+422831. In the Kepler Input Catalog it has the designation of KIC 6960913, and when it was found to have transiting planet candidates it was given the Kepler object of interest number of KOI-1361.

Planetary candidates were detected around the star by NASA's Kepler Mission, a mission tasked with discovering planets in transit around their stars. The transit method that Kepler uses involves detecting dips in brightness in stars. These dips in brightness can be interpreted as planets whose orbits pass in front of their stars from the perspective of Earth, although other phenomenon can also be responsible which is why the term planetary candidate is used.

Following the acceptance of the discovery paper, the Kepler team provided an additional moniker for the system of "Kepler-61". The discoverers referred to the star as Kepler-61, which is the normal procedure for naming the exoplanets discovered by the spacecraft. Hence, this is the name used by the public to refer to the star and its planet.

Candidate planets that are associated with stars studied by the Kepler Mission are assigned the designations ".01" etc. after the star's name, in the order of discovery. If planet candidates are detected simultaneously, then the ordering follows the order of orbital periods from shortest to longest. Following these rules, there was only one candidate planet were detected, with an orbital period of 59.87756 days.

The designation b, derive from the order of discovery. The designation of b is given to the first planet orbiting a given star, followed by the other lowercase letters of the alphabet. In the case of Kepler-61, there was only one planet detected, so only the letter b is used. The name Kepler-61 derives directly from the fact that the star is the catalogued 61st star discovered by Kepler to have confirmed planets.

== Stellar characteristics ==
Kepler-61 is a K-type main sequence star that is approximately 63% the mass of and 62% the radius of the Sun. It has a temperature of 4017 K and is about 1 billion years old. In comparison, the Sun is about 4.6 billion years old and has a temperature of 5778 K.

The star is a bit more rich in metals then the Sun, with a metallicity ([Fe/H]) of about 0.03, or about 107% of the amount of iron and other heavier metals found in the Sun. The star's luminosity is somewhat normal for a star like Kepler-61, with a luminosity of around 8% of that of the solar luminosity.

The star's apparent magnitude, or how bright it appears from Earth's perspective, is 15. Therefore, it is too dim to be seen with the naked eye.

== Planetary system ==
The Kepler-61 planetary system
Companion (in order from star)	Mass	Semimajor axis (AU)	Orbital period (days)	Eccentricity	Inclination (°)	Radius
b	6.65 M_{🜨}	0.26	59.87756	<0.25	>89.80	2.15 ± 0.13 R_{🜨}

The only known planet transits the star; this means that the planet's orbit appear to cross in front of their star as viewed from the Earth's perspective. Its inclination relative to Earth's line of sight, or how far above or below the plane of sight they are, vary by less than one degree. This allows direct measurements of the planet's periods and relative diameters (compared to the host star) by monitoring the planet's transit of the star.

Kepler-61b is a super-Earth with a radius 2.15 times that of Earth, and orbits near the inner edge of the habitable zone. It has an eccentric orbit that takes it in and out and thus experiences temperature swings, which may hinder its habitability. Also because of its radius, it may be a mini-Neptune, without a solid surface.

== See also ==
- Kepler Mission
- List of planetary systems
