= Kepler-19b =

Super-Earth orbiting Kepler-19

Discovery
- Discovered by: William J. Borucki et al.
- Discovery date: 2 February 2011
- Detection method: Transit method

Orbital characteristics
- Semi-major axis: 0.085 AU (12,700,000 km)
- Orbital period (sidereal): 9.2869944 ± 0.0000088 d
- Inclination: 89.94+0.06 −0.44
- Star: Kepler-19

Physical characteristics
- Mean radius: 2.209 ± 0.048 R_{🜨}
- Mass: 8.4 ± 1.6 M_{🜨}
- Mean density: 4.32 ± 0.87 g/cm^{3} (0.156 ± 0.031 lb/cu in)

Kepler-19b is a planet orbiting around the star Kepler-19. The planet has an orbital period of 9.3 days, with an estimated radius of roughly 2.2 times that of the Earth, with a mass around 8.4 times that of the Earth. It is one of three planets orbiting Kepler-19.

== See also ==
- List of planets discovered by the Kepler spacecraft
- Exoplanet

== Other planets in the Kepler-19 system ==
- Kepler-19c
- Kepler-19d
