= Gyr =

Gyr or gyr can mean:

- Gyr (cattle), a Zebu breed of cattle
- Billion years (Gyr)
- Guarayu language
- Gyrfalcon
- Phoenix Goodyear Airport, in Arizona, United States
- Radu Gyr (1905–1975), Romanian writer

== See also ==
- GIR (disambiguation)
