= Jason Steffen =

American astrophysicist (born 1975)

- Born: Jason Hyrum Steffen; May 15, 1975 (age 50); Fairfield, California
- Education: Weber State University; University of Washington
- Known for: Research on exoplanets
- Awards: Fermilab Technology Award (2013)
- Scientific career
- Fields: Astrophysics
- Institutions: University of Nevada, Las Vegas
- Thesis: Detecting new planets in transiting systems (2006)
- Doctoral advisor: Eric Agol

Jason Hyrum Steffen (born May 15, 1975) is an American astrophysicist and assistant professor of physics and astronomy at the University of Nevada, Las Vegas (UNLV). He is also a member of the science team for NASA's Kepler space telescope mission. He worked at Fermilab and Northwestern University for a decade before joining the UNLV faculty. He is known for his work on the discoveries of several exoplanets. He has also developed an alternative method for boarding passengers onto commercial aircraft, known as the Steffen Boarding Method. It has been found to be significantly faster than the "back-to-front" method used by most commercial airlines. He was inspired to begin research on the topic after waiting in an exceptionally long line to board a plane at an airport.
