= Transit-timing variation =

Exoplanet detection method using transit timing variations

Animation showing difference between planet transit timing of 1-planet and 2-planet systems. Credit: NASA/Kepler Mission.

Transit-timing variation is a method for detecting exoplanets by observing variations in the timing of a transit. This provides an extremely sensitive method capable of detecting additional planets in the system with masses potentially as small as that of Earth. In tightly packed planetary systems, the gravitational pull of the planets among themselves causes one planet to accelerate and another planet to decelerate along its orbit. The acceleration causes the orbital period of each planet to change. Detecting this effect by measuring the change is known as transit-timing variations. "Timing variation" asks whether the transit occurs with strict periodicity or if there exists a variation.

The first significant detection of a non-transiting planet using transit-timing variations was carried out with NASA's Kepler telescope. The transiting planet Kepler-19b shows transit-timing variation with an amplitude of 5 minutes and a period of about 300 days, indicating the presence of a second planet, Kepler-19c, which has a period that is a near-rational multiple of the period of the transiting planet.

In 2010, researchers proposed a second planet orbiting WASP-3 based on transit-timing variation, but this proposal was debunked in 2012.

Transit-timing variation was first convincingly detected for planets Kepler-9b and Kepler-9c and gained popularity by 2012 for confirming exoplanet discoveries.

Exoplanet TOI-199c was also discovered using this method.

TTV can also be used to indirectly measure the mass of the exoplanets in compact, multiple-planet systems and/or system whose planets are in resonant chains. By performing a series of analytical (TTVFaster) and numerical (TTVFast and Mercury) n-body integrations of a system of six gravitationally interacting, co-planar planets, the initial mass estimates for the six inner planets of TRAPPIST-1, along with their orbital eccentricities, were determined.
