= Internal heating =

Heat originating from within a celestial object

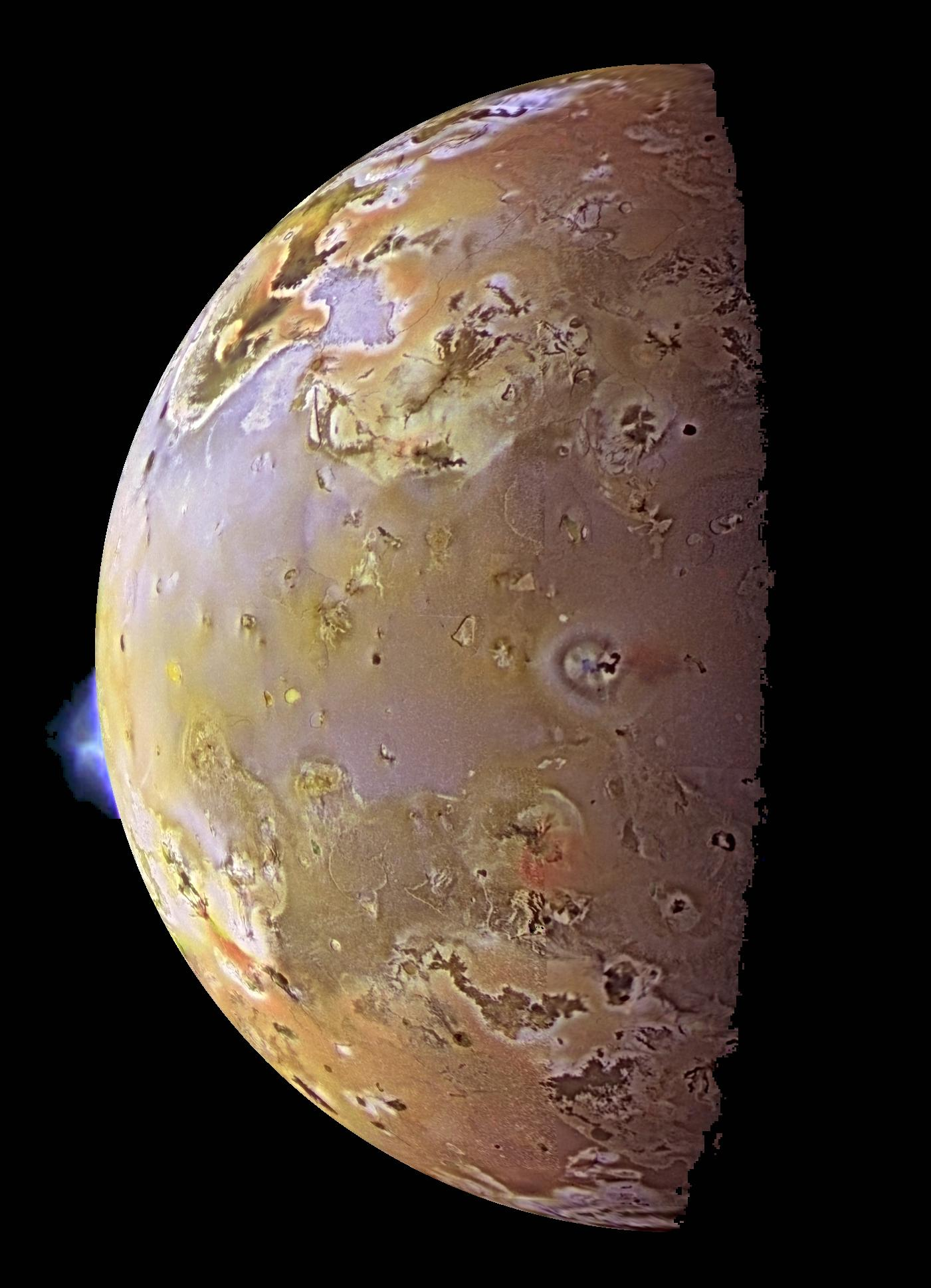
A plume on the limb of Jupiter's moon Io comes from an active volcano, which is most likely the result of tidal heating

Internal heat is the heat source from the interior of astronomical bodies, such as stars, brown dwarfs, planets, moons, dwarf planets, and (in the early history of the Solar System) even asteroids such as Vesta. Heat sources include contraction caused by gravity (the Kelvin–Helmholtz mechanism), nuclear fusion, tidal heating, core solidification (heat of fusion released as molten core material solidifies), crystallization, induction heating, and radioactive decay. The amount of internal heating depends on mass; the more massive the object, the more internal heat it has; also, for a given density, the more massive the object, the greater the ratio of mass to surface area, and thus the greater the retention of internal heat. The internal heating keeps astronomical bodies warm and active.

== Planets ==
=== Terrestrial planets ===
In the early history of the Solar System, radioactive isotopes having a half-life on the order of a few million years (such as aluminium-26 and iron-60) were sufficiently abundant to produce enough heat to cause internal melting of planetesimals, some moons and even some asteroids, such as Vesta. After these radioactive isotopes had decayed to insignificant levels, the heat generated by longer-lived radioactive isotopes (such as potassium-40, thorium-232, and uranium-235 and uranium-238) was insufficient to keep these bodies molten unless they had an alternative source of internal heating, such as tidal heating. Thus, Earth's Moon, which has no alternative source of internal heating is now geologically dead, whereas a moon as small as Enceladus that has sufficient tidal heating and some remaining radioactive heating, is able to maintain an active and directly detectable cryovolcanism.

The internal heating within terrestrial planets powers tectonic and volcanic activities. Of the terrestrial planets in the Solar System, Earth has the most internal heating because it is the largest. Mercury and Mars have no ongoing visible surface effects of internal heating because they are only 5 and 11% the mass of Earth respectively; they are nearly "geologically dead" (however, see Mercury's magnetic field and Geological history of Mars). Earth, being more massive, has a great enough ratio of mass to surface area for its internal heating to drive plate tectonics and volcanism. For Venus, stagnant lid tectonics means the internal heat escapes through volcanism and periodic resurfacing.

=== Giant planets ===
The giant planets have much greater internal heating than terrestrial planets, due to their greater mass and greater compressibility making more energy available from gravitational contraction. Jupiter, the most massive planet in the Solar System, has the most internal heating. For the outer planets of the Solar System, internal heating powers the weather and wind instead of sunlight that powers the weather for terrestrial planets. The internal heating within giant planets raise temperatures higher than expected from solar energy alone, although Uranus has an anomalously low heat flux by comparison. In the case of Jupiter, the ratio of emitted thermal energy to the energy absorbed from the Sun is 1.668±0.085.

A combination of external and internal heating (which may be a combination of tidal heating and electromagnetic heating) is thought to make giant planets that orbit very close to their stars (hot Jupiters) into "puffy planets". External heating is not thought to be sufficient by itself.

== Brown dwarfs ==
Brown dwarfs are substellar objects that occupy the mass range between the heaviest gas giants and the lightest stars. They range in mass from about 13 Jupiter masses (M_{J}) up to around 75 to 80 M_{J}. Unlike main-sequence stars, they are not massive enough to sustain hydrogen-1 fusion reactions in their cores. Brown dwarfs have greater internal heating than gas giants but not as great as stars. Like gas giants, brown dwarfs can have weather and wind powered by this internal heating.

Initially generated by gravitational contraction, the internal heating within young brown dwarfs is sufficient to ignite and sustain fusion of deuterium with hydrogen into helium. Most of the deuterium fusion occurs within the first 100–300 million years, after which the brown dwarf will steady cool as it radiates away its internal energy. For the largest brown dwarfs above about 68 M_{J}, the core heat is enough to briefly ignite and sustain fusion of lithium with hydrogen, but not fusion of hydrogen with itself. For brown dwarfs in close orbits, tidal forces can be an additional source of internal heating.

== Stars ==
Following an initial phase of gravitational contraction, the internal heating within stars is sufficient to ignite and sustain thermonuclear fusion of hydrogen with itself to form helium. The Sun for example has a core temperature of 15,700,000 K. This is maintained through hydrostatic equilibrium as the internal heating counterbalances the gravitational collapse of the star. The more massive the stars are, the more internal heating they have. As the fusion produces waste products that diminish the abundance of fusing elements, the core must condense and increase in temperature to maintain equilibrium, resulting in a steady increase in luminosity of the star.

As stars evolve, they can make heavier elements through nucleosynthesis. Depending upon the mass of the star, the core may become hot enough to fuse helium, forming carbon and oxygen and traces of heavier elements, and for sufficiently massive stars even large quantities of heavier elements. During the end of its fusing lifecycle, the density and composition of the core region increases dramatically as successive fuels for fusion are consumed. This is accompanied by faster consumption of the remaining fuel.

Fusion to produce elements heavier than iron and nickel no longer releases energy. Since stellar cores massive enough to attain the temperatures required to produce these elements are too massive to form stable white dwarf stars, a core collapse supernova results. This event produces a neutron star or a black hole, depending upon the mass. Heat generated by the collapse is trapped within a neutron star and only escapes slowly, due to the small surface area; heat cannot be conducted out of a black hole. However, see Hawking radiation.

== See also ==
- White dwarf cooling anomaly

== Bibliography ==
- Bennett, Jeffrey; Shostak, Seth; Schneider, Nicholas; MacGregor, Meredith (2017). Life in the Universe. Princeton University Press.
