= LSPM J0207+3331 =

Star in the constellation Taurus

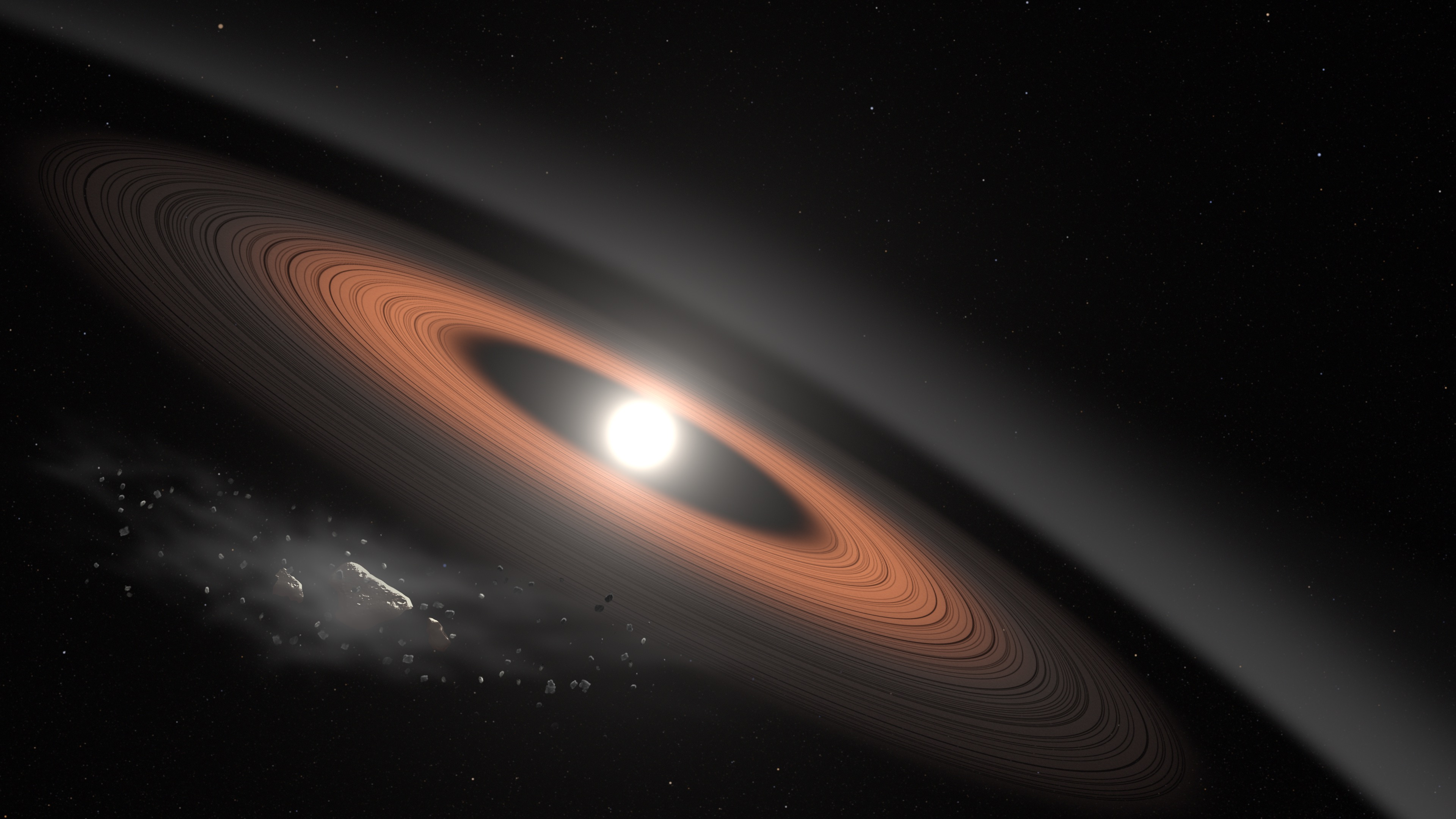
- Artist's impression using the old interpretation of a two ring disk. Newer analysis favour a single ring. Credit: NASA’s Goddard Space Flight Center/Scott Wiessinger

Observation data Epoch J2000 Equinox ICRS
- Constellation: Triangulum
- Right ascension: 02^{h} 07^{m} 33.8061^{s}
- Declination: +33° 31′ 29.542″

Characteristics
- Evolutionary stage: white dwarf
- Spectral type: DZA
- Apparent magnitude (g): 17.86 ± 0.02
- Apparent magnitude (r): 17.49 ± 0.02
- Apparent magnitude (i): 17.34 ± 0.02
- Apparent magnitude (J): 16.6±0.1

Astrometry
Proper motion (μ)	RA: 169.843(151) mas/yr Dec.: −25.850(202) mas/yr
Parallax (π)	22.4986±0.1563 mas
Distance	145 ± 1 ly (44.4 ± 0.3 pc)

Details
Mass	0.656±0.029 M_{☉}
Radius	0.0118±0.0004 R_{☉}
Surface gravity (log g)	8.11±0.03 cgs
Temperature	5910±98 K
Age	3.08±0.32 Gyr

Other designations
- 2MASS J02073383+3331296, Gaia DR3 325899163483416704

Database references
SIMBAD	data

LSPM J0207+3331 is a cold and old white dwarf that hosts a circumstellar disk, located 145 light-years from Earth. It was discovered in October 2018 by a volunteer participating in the Backyard Worlds citizen science project. The white dwarf accreted a massive differentiated rocky body with a large planetary core. Until 2021 it was the oldest and coldest white dwarf known to host a disk. The white dwarf WD 2317+1830 with a detected disk is at least twice as old and around 2,000 K colder.

The white dwarf has a radius of 0.011 R_{☉}, which is about 1.2 times the radius of the Earth. Because white dwarfs are such dense objects, LSPM J0207 has a mass of about 0.69 M_{☉}. The presence of the Paschen Beta-Line in a near-infrared spectrum from the Keck telescope helped to determine that the atmosphere of LSPM J0207 is dominated by hydrogen (spectral type DA). The optical spectrum shows that the white dwarf atmosphere is polluted with 13 heavy elements, accreted from the disk into the white dwarf atmosphere. This is the highest number of elements found in a white dwarf with a hydrogen atmosphere.

The white dwarf formed around 3.1 billion years from a star with a mass of 1.86±0.44 M_{☉}. This star had a lifetime of 1.54+1.92
−0.56 billion years.

== Debris disk ==
The white dwarf has a circumstellar disk despite being 3 billion years old. The infrared excess in the spectrum was first interpreted as two separate rings. Later it was however found that this feature is caused by silicate dust in a single ring, lying between 36 and 54.1 R_{WD} and having a mass of 5.4 × 10^{19} g. It may be a debris disk created from an asteroid broken apart by the star's gravity. The mass of heavy elements in the convective zone of the white dwarf is currently 1.22 × 10^{22} g, which is the lower limit of the parent body mass. This parent body would be larger than 225 km.

One work used photometry of the Astrophysical Observatory of Javalambre of the J-PLUS survey to predict a 89.7% chance of the white dwarf having absorption due to calcium. Later 13 heavy elements were found in spectroscopic observations with Lick Observatory, Magellan Baade Telescope and Keck I telescope. The lack of molecular CH suggests a body depleted in carbon-volatiles. The composition is earth-like, with an enhanced abundance of siderophilic elements. The researchers interpret this as a massive differentiated rocky body with a large core (mass fraction of 55%) that got accreted.

It is only the 5th white dwarf with detected strontium, showing that this element is preferably detected in cooler white dwarfs. Strontium has a short sinking time of around 35,000 years, showing that accretion is ongoing on LSPM J0207+3331. It is also only the second white dwarf with calcium H+K line core emission, likely originating in the upper atmosphere of the white dwarf. The researchers suggest this hints at additional physical processes that require future investigation.

Models predict only a low rate of asteroids to be disrupted by an old white dwarf. The 1 Gyr simulations by Debes et al. found that only one asteroid per simulation was disrupted 200 Myrs after the white dwarf has formed. The presence of a disk around a 3 Gyr white dwarf sets new demands for models that seek to explain dust around white dwarfs.

=== Two-ring model ===
An early interpretation was that the disk did compose of two rings. Newer analysis interpret the 11.6 μm emission in WISE data as silicate emission. James Webb Space Telescope spectroscopy is needed to confirm this interpretation and to study the mineralogy of the parent body.

The inner disk is optically thick with an inner radius of 0.047 R_{☉} and an outer radius of 0.21 R_{☉}. The outer disk is optically thin. It is located near the Roche radius at around 0.94 R_{☉} and has a mass of a small asteroid or comet. This suggests that the outer disk formed relative recently from a tidal disruption of such a small body. If this outer disk is confirmed, it would be the first known dusty white dwarf with a two-component ring system. Alternatively the gap in the disk could be explained by a dense exoplanet orbiting inside the disk and clearing a gap, or a planet orbiting outside the disk and opening a gap via resonant dynamics. Due to the inner edge of the inner disk being located near the sublimation radius of fayalite and iron, it is suggested that the inner disk is composed of these materials. It is however not excluded that forsterite is a component of the inner disk.

== See also ==
- List of exoplanets and planetary debris around white dwarfs

Other old and cold white dwarfs with planetary debris:

- Van Maanen 2 (6,130 K)
- WD J2356−209 (4,040 K)
- WD 2317+1830 (4,557 K)
- WD J2147–4035 (3,050 K)

Other white dwarfs polluted by more than one minor planet:

- WD 1337+705 polluted by an iron-rich body and an ice-rich body
