= WD J1953−1019 =

Star system in the constellation Aquila

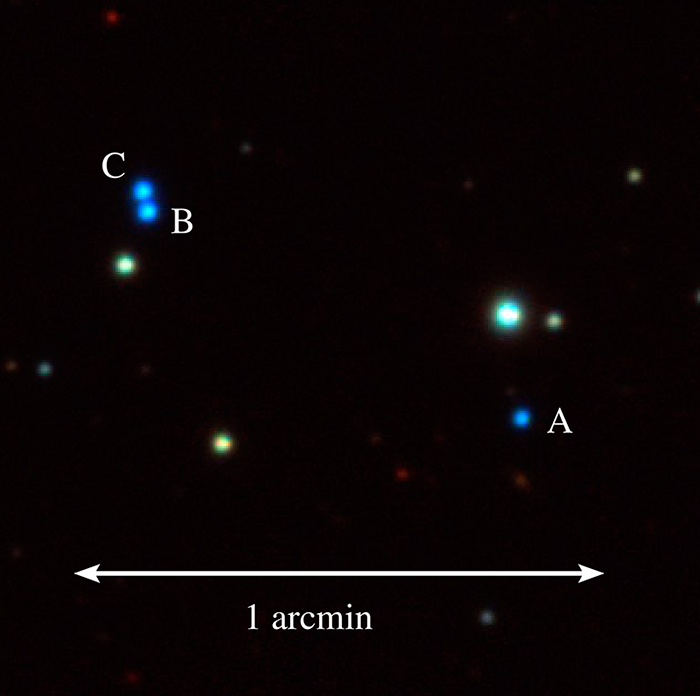
- Pan-STARRS color composite image of the WD J1953−1019 system, with the three components annotated. (Note: The color composite consists of Pan-STARRS images taken in g, i, and y passband filters. These filters correspond to specific wavelengths of 481 nm, 752 nm, and 962 nm, respectively.)

Observation data Epoch 2015.5 Equinox ICRS
- Constellation: Aquila
- Right ascension: A: 19^{h} 53^{m} 33.12^{s} B: 19^{h} 53^{m} 36.00^{s} C: 19^{h} 53^{m} 36.04^{s}
- Declination: A: −10° 19′ 54.8″ B: −10° 19′ 31.5″ C: −10° 19′ 29.2″

Characteristics
- Evolutionary stage: White dwarf
- Spectral type: DA
- Apparent magnitude (V): 17.27 (A); 16.05 (B); 16.29 (C)
- Apparent magnitude (G): 17.28 (A); 16.35 (B); 16.44 (C)
- Apparent magnitude (B): 17.27 (A); 16.05 (B); 16.29 (C)
- Apparent magnitude (R): 17.30 (A); 16.30 (B); 16.44 (C)
- Apparent magnitude (g): 17.18 (A); 16.15 (B); 16.24 (C)

Astrometry

A
Proper motion (μ)	RA: −10.958 mas/yr Dec.: −16.137 mas/yr
Parallax (π)	7.7645±0.0965 mas
Distance	420 ± 5 ly (129 ± 2 pc)

B
Proper motion (μ)	RA: −11.482 mas/yr Dec.: −16.518 mas/yr
Parallax (π)	7.7517±0.0613 mas
Distance	421 ± 3 ly (129 ± 1 pc)

C
Proper motion (μ)	RA: −10.922 mas/yr Dec.: −15.783 mas/yr
Parallax (π)	7.6628±0.0612 mas
Distance	426 ± 3 ly (131 ± 1 pc)

Details

A
Mass	0.63 ±0.03 M_{☉}
Radius	0.0127±0.0004 (Note: Based on known mass and surface gravity of star.) R_{☉}
Luminosity	0.00514+0.00048 −0.00045 (Note: Based on known temperature and derived radius of star.) L_{☉}
Surface gravity (log g)	8.03 ± 0.05 cgs
Temperature	13 715 ± 310 K
Age	290 ± 40 Myr

B
Mass	0.62 ± 0.03 M_{☉}
Radius	0.0133 ± 0.0004 R_{☉}
Luminosity	0.0391+0.0026 −0.0025 L_{☉}
Surface gravity (log g)	7.98 ± 0.05 cgs
Temperature	22 223 ± 360 K
Age	42 ± 8 Myr

C
Mass	0.60 ± 0.03 M_{☉}
Radius	0.0136 ± 0.0004 R_{☉}
Luminosity	0.0397+0.0026 −0.0025 L_{☉}
Surface gravity (log g)	7.95 ± 0.05 cgs
Temperature	22 104 ± 350 K
Age	40 ± 8 Myr

Other designations
- A: Gaia DR2 4190500054845023488; B: Gaia DR2 4190499986125543168; C: Gaia DR2 4190499986125543296

Database references
SIMBAD	A
- B
- C

WD J1953−1019 is a hierarchical triple system of white dwarfs located at about 130 parsecs (about 420 light years) from the Earth. This is the first triple system of white dwarfs to be resolved. The three white dwarfs have an atmosphere of pure hydrogen and a mass of about 0.6 times that of the Sun.

The system consists of a central pair, WD J1953−1019 BC, and a distant companion, WD J1953−1019 A. WD J1953−1019 B and C correspond to the sources Gaia DR2 4190499986125543168 and 4190499986125543296 respectively. The white dwarfs of the central pair, WD J1953−1019 B and C, are separated 303.25±0.01 AU from each other while the distant companion, WD J1953−1019 A, orbits the barycenter, or center of mass, of the central binary at a distance of 6398.97±0.09 AU.

The cooling age found by M. Perpinyà-Vallès and collaborators for the three white dwarfs is consistent with an estimated value between 40 and 290 million years. The three stars would each come from a star that had a mass between 1.6 and 2.6 times that of the Sun. A collision of the central pair due to Lidov-Kozai oscillations is unlikely as the system is dynamically stable. However, if this collision occurred, it could produce a Type Ia supernova below the Chandrasekhar mass.

== See also ==
- SDSS J0106−1000 – a short-period binary white dwarf system, in the constellation Cetus
- WD J0651+2844 – another short-period binary white dwarf system, in the constellation Gemini
