= ESO 439-26 =

White dwarf star

Observation data Epoch J2000.0 Equinox ICRS
- Constellation: Hydra
- Right ascension: 11^{h} 39^{m} 03.1037^{s}
- Declination: −28° 52′ 16.628″
- Apparent magnitude (V): 20.52

Characteristics
- Spectral type: DC9
- U−B color index: 1.03
- B−V color index: 0.64
- R−I color index: 1.14

Astrometry
Proper motion (μ)	RA: -397.767 ±0.481 mas/yr Dec.: + 36.869 ±0.441 mas/yr
Parallax (π)	9.7390±0.5007 mas
Distance	330 ± 20 ly (103 ± 5 pc)
Absolute magnitude (M_{V})	15.46

Details
Mass	0.50 ±0.15 M_{☉}
Radius	0.0126 R_{☉}
Luminosity	1.15 ×10^{−5} L_{☉}
Surface gravity (log g)	7.87 ±0.28 cgs
Temperature	4,673±275 K

Other designations
- Ruiz 439-26, WD 1136-286

Database references
SIMBAD	data

ESO 439-26 is a white dwarf star. It was considered the least luminous white dwarf known. Located 140 light years away from the Sun, it is roughly 10 billion years old and has a temperature of 4560 Kelvin (cooler than the Sun, at 5772 Kelvin). Thus, despite being classified as a "white dwarf", it would actually appear yellowish in color.

This finding is however based on a too large parallax. Gaia measurement of the parallax shows a more distant source and therefore an absolute magnitude of M_{G}=15.0 mag. For example the white dwarf WD J2147–4035 has M_{G}=17.7 mag, making this white dwarf less luminous. The updated M_{V} is 15.46, using the Gaia parallax and the apparent V-magnitude from Ruiz et al. (see formulae at the article absolute magnitude).
