= Perpendicular paramagnetic bond =

Type of chemical bond in white dwarfs

A perpendicular paramagnetic bond is a type of chemical bond that does not exist under normal, atmospheric conditions. Such a phenomenon was first hypothesized through simulation to exist in the atmospheres of white dwarf stars whose magnetic fields, on the order of 10^{5} teslas, could allow such interactions to exist. In a very strong magnetic field, excited electrons in molecules may be stabilized, causing these molecules to abandon their original orientations parallel to the magnetic field and instead lie perpendicular to it. Normally, at such intense temperatures as those near a white dwarf, more common molecular bonds cannot form and existing ones decompose.
