= SDSS J0106−1000 =

Binary star in the constellation Cetus

Observation data Epoch J2000 Equinox ICRS
- Constellation: Cetus
- Right ascension: 01^{h} 04^{m} 26.9718992211^{s}
- Declination: -10^{h} 16^{m} 04.000029403^{s}

Characteristics

Astrometry
Parallax (π)	1.2011±0.4739 mas
Distance	approx. 3,000 ly (approx. 800 pc)

Orbit
Period (P)	39.100 ± 0.028 min
Semi-major axis (a)	0.32R_{☉}
Eccentricity (e)	0
Inclination (i)	56+11 −8°

Details

A
Mass	0.17 M_{☉}
Radius	0.065+0.004 −0.003 R_{☉}
Surface gravity (log g)	6.01 ± 0.04 cgs
Temperature	16485 ± 456 K

B
Mass	0.43 M_{☉}
Radius	≈0.02 R_{☉}
Temperature	≤14600 K

Other designations
- SDSS J010657.39−100003.3, SDSS J0106−1000, J0106−1000

Database references
SIMBAD	data

SDSS J0106-1000 (full name: SDSS J010657.39-100003.3) is a binary star located about 7,800 light-years from Earth in the constellation Cetus.

This system consists of two white dwarfs orbiting about each other once every 39 minutes. It was one of the shortest-period detached binary white dwarf systems known in 2011 They are separated from each other by only 32% of the radius of the Sun, so that each dwarf is tidally distorting the other. Despite their proximity to each other, this does not form an eclipsing binary system because the inclination of the orbital plane to the line of sight to the Earth is about 67°± 13°.

As the two orbit, they are emitting gravitational radiation, causing the two white dwarfs to gradually draw closer together. This will cause the two stars to merge in about 37 million years. Since their masses are 0.17 and 0.43 solar masses, the resulting combined mass will be 0.60 times the mass of the Sun. At this point they are expected to form a subdwarf B star that will begin generating energy through the nuclear fusion of helium.
