= WD J2356−209 =

White dwarf star in the constellation Cetus

Observation data Epoch J2000.0 (ICRS) Equinox ICRS
- Constellation: Cetus
- Right ascension: 23^{h} 56^{m} 45.096^{s}
- Declination: −20° 54′ 49.94″
- Apparent magnitude (V): 20.7

Characteristics
- Evolutionary stage: white dwarf
- Spectral type: DC or DZ

Astrometry
| Proper motion (μ) | RA: −295.490 mas/yr Dec.: −239.372 mas/yr |
| Parallax (π) | 15.2759±0.5810 mas |
| Distance | 214 ± 8 ly (65 ± 2 pc) |

Details
| Mass | 0.56 M_{☉} |
| Surface gravity (log g) | 8.26±0.15 cgs |
| Temperature | 4,310±190 K |
| Age | 8.0±0.8 Gyr |

Database references
| SIMBAD | data |

WD J2356−209 (also known as WD 2354−211) is a white dwarf star located 65 pc (212 ly) away from the Earth. It is a very faint white dwarf, with an apparent visual magnitude of 21.03. Its visible spectrum is dominated by a broad absorption feature that has been attributed to pressure-broadened sodium D lines. The presence of this sodium absorption feature and the detection of spectral lines from other heavy elements (calcium, iron and magnesium) indicate that the photosphere of WD J2356−209 has been polluted by a recent rocky debris accretion episode. A detailed analysis of the spectrum of WD J2356−209 shows that the accreted planetesimal was abnormally sodium-rich, containing up to ten times more sodium than calcium. With an effective temperature of 4040 K, WD J2356−209 was the coolest metal-polluted white dwarf observed at the time (and also the oldest, with a white dwarf cooling age of about 8 Gyr).

== See also ==
- List of exoplanets and planetary debris around white dwarfs
- WD J2147–4035 is the coldest and oldest metal-polluted white dwarf (as of September 2024)
- WD 2317+1830 is another cold metal-polluted white dwarf
