= WD J2147–4035 =

White dwarf in the constellation Grus

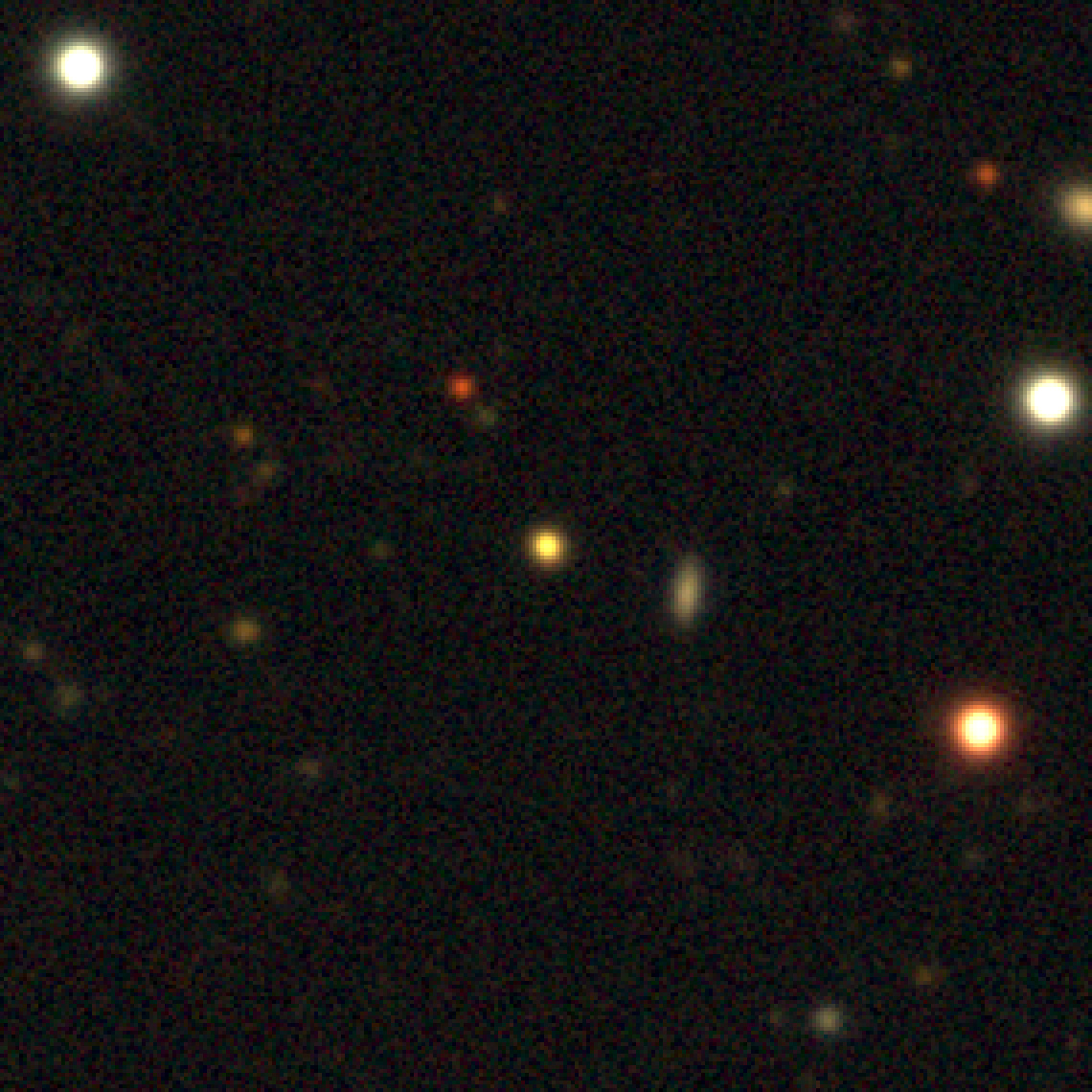
- Optical+infrared image of WD J2147–4035 (orange star in the center); Credit: Legacy Surveys / D. Lang (Perimeter Institute)

Observation data Epoch J2000 Equinox J2000
- Constellation: Grus
- Right ascension: 21^{h} 47^{m} 56.59^{s}
- Declination: −40° 35′ 27.79″

Characteristics
- Evolutionary stage: white dwarf
- Spectral type: DZQH
- Apparent magnitude (G): 19.96
- Variable type: rotational variable

Astrometry
Radial velocity (R_{v})	80.6 ±17.1 km/s
Proper motion (μ)	RA: -84.113 ±0.418 mas/yr Dec.: -112.391 ±0.423 mas/yr
Parallax (π)	35.7904±0.4921 mas
Distance	91 ± 1 ly (27.9 ± 0.4 pc)

Details
Mass	0.69 ±0.02 M_{☉}
Radius	0.01100 ±0.00032 R_{☉}
Surface gravity (log g)	8.195 ±0.042 cgs
Temperature	3048 ±35 K
Rotation	13 hours
Age	10.7 ±0.3 Gyr

Other designations
- DES J214756.46-403529.3, WISE J214756.50-403529.2, EQ J2147-4035, Gaia DR2 6584418167391671808

Database references
SIMBAD	data

WD J2147–4035 (DES J214756.46-403529.3) is a very cold white dwarf with a temperature of about 3,050 Kelvin (2780 °C; 5030 °F). Hence, it would appear reddish to the naked eye, despite its classification as a white dwarf. It also shows signs of pollution with planetary debris.

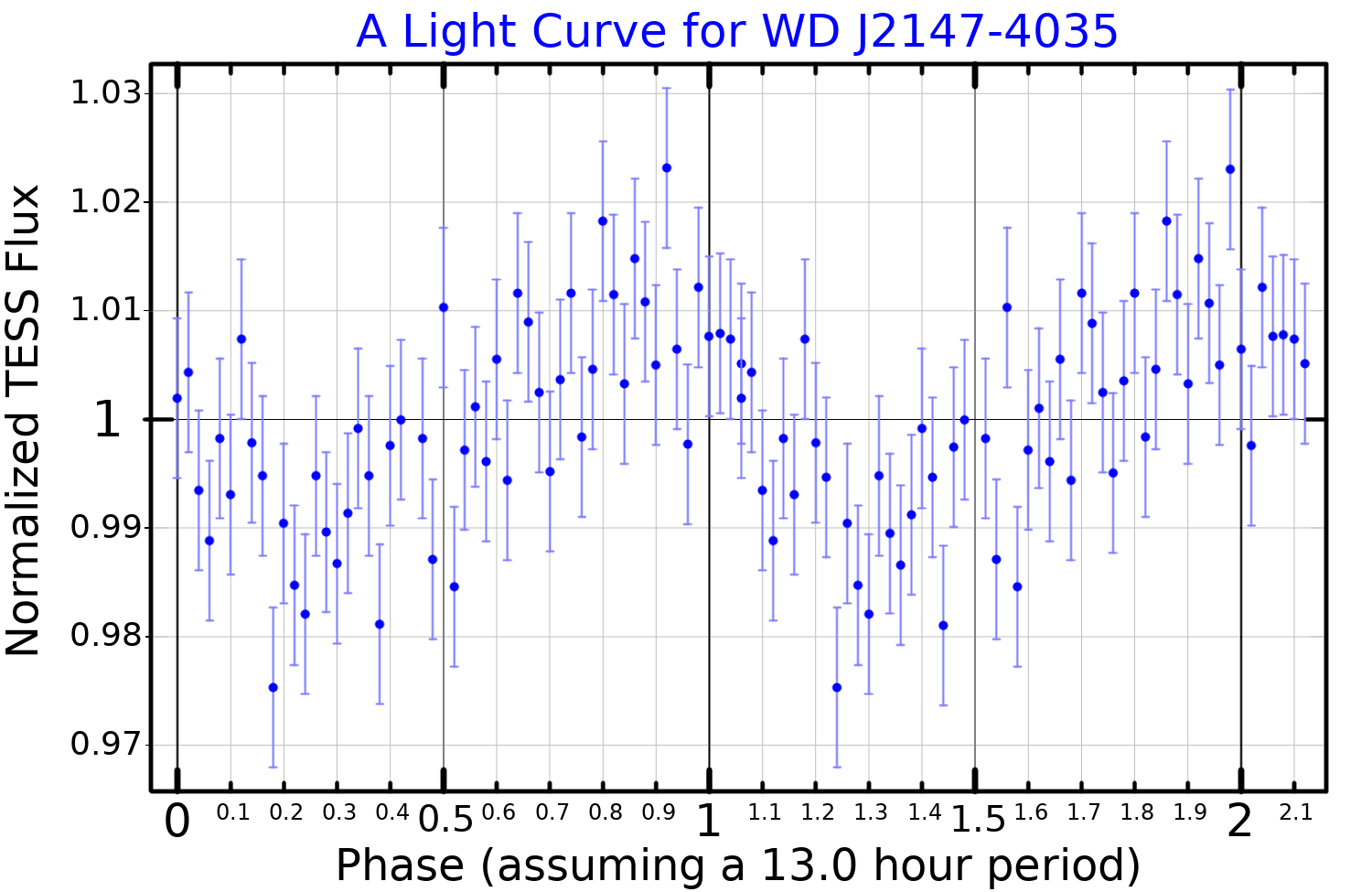
A light curve for WD J2147-4035, adapted from Elms et al. (2022)

WD J2147–4035 was first identified from Gaia data as a white dwarf candidate in 2019. In 2021 it was pointed out as an unusual faint white dwarf in the solar neighbourhood. The researchers found it could be extremely old (about 10 Gyrs). In 2022 results from observations with X-shooter on the Very Large Telescope were published. The object was identified as a white dwarf, likely with a helium-dominated atmosphere. The researchers also detected metal pollution in the form of sodium, lithium, potassium and possibly carbon. The lithium line shows Zeeman splitting, which indicates that WD J2147–4035 is a magnetic white dwarf. The researchers measure a magnetic field strength of 0.55 ±0.03 Megagauss. The magnetism can lead to inhomogeneous brightness distribution and the TESS light curve shows that the white dwarf has a rotation period of around 13 hours. The nature of the accreted parent body is unclear as of September 2024.

WD J2147–4035 was once a main-sequence star with a mass of 2.47 ±0.22 M_{☉}, which had a lifetime of about 500 Myrs. Once the star became an AGB star, it lost mass and became a white dwarf with a mass of 0.69 ±0.02 M_{☉}. The white dwarf existed for 10.21 ±0.22 Gyrs, meaning the total age is 10.7 ±0.3 Gyrs.

Cold white dwarfs are often strongly affected by collision induced absorption (CIA) of hydrogen. This can lead to faint optical red and infrared brightness. These white dwarfs are also called IR-faint white dwarfs. WD J2147–4035 is however very red (r-z=2.29 mag) which is seen as evidence that it only has a low hydrogen to helium ratio, resulting in very mild CIA and therefore giving it the distinct orange color.

== See also ==
- List of exoplanets and planetary debris around white dwarfs
- ESO 439-26 is a cold white dwarf, once thought to be the faintest

Other cool metal-polluted white dwarfs:

- WD J2356−209
- WD 2317+1830
