= WD 2317+1830 =

White dwarf in the constellation Pegasus

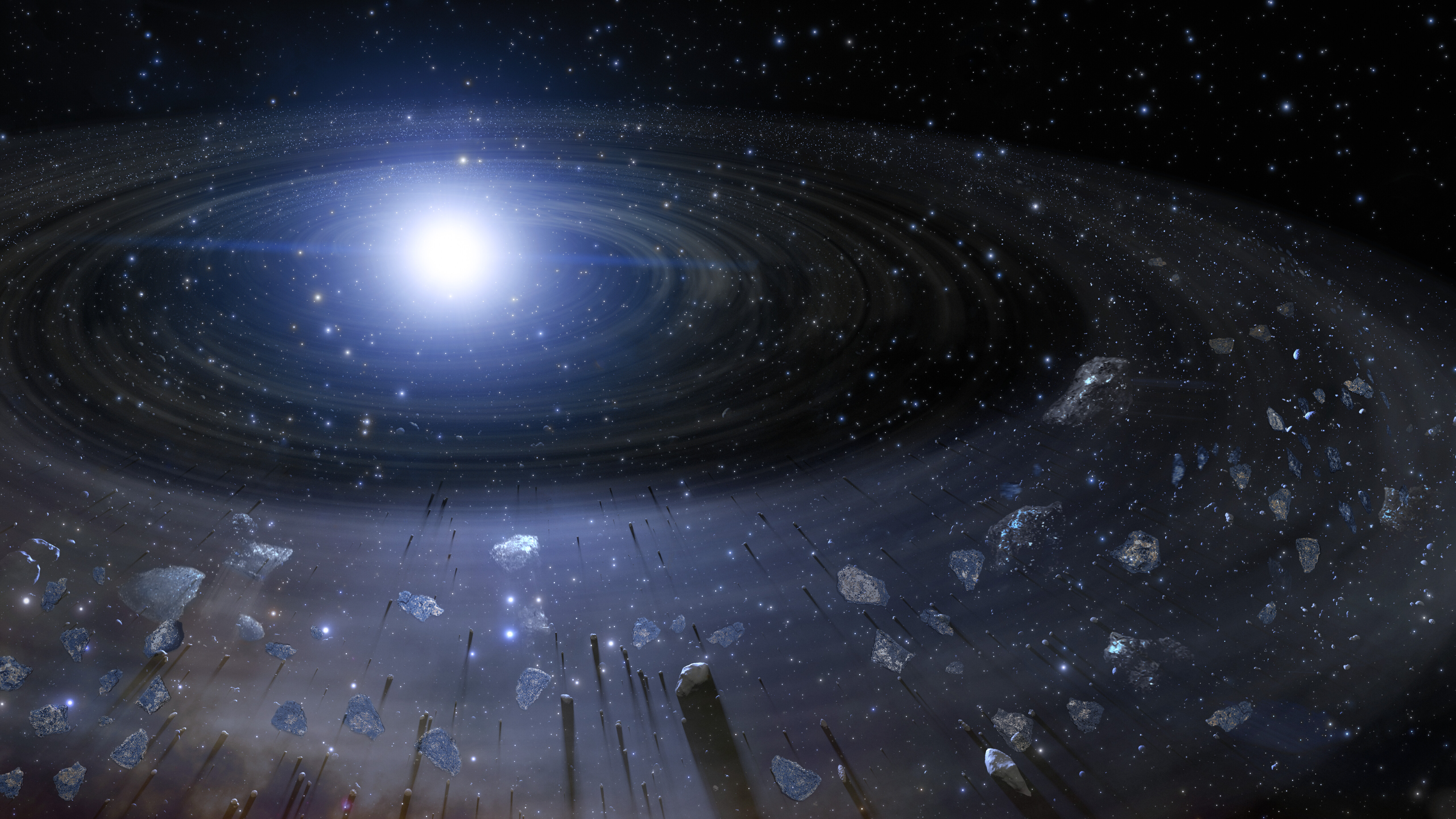
- Artist's impression of a white dwarf with a disk Credit: NOIRLab/NSF/AURA/J. da Silva; Image processing: M. Zamani and M. Kosari (NSF NOIRLab)

Observation data Epoch J2000 Equinox J2000
- Constellation: Pegasus
- Right ascension: 23^{h} 17^{m} 26.74^{s}
- Declination: +18° 30′ 52.76″

Characteristics
- Evolutionary stage: white dwarf
- Spectral type: DZ
- Apparent magnitude (G): 19.35

Astrometry
Radial velocity (R_{v})	25 ±31 km/s
Proper motion (μ)	RA: -33.855 ±0.317 mas/yr Dec.: -452.811 ±0.263 mas/yr
Parallax (π)	26.4097±0.3090 mas
Distance	123 ± 1 ly (37.9 ± 0.4 pc)

Details
Mass	1.076+0.007 −0.008 M_{☉}
Radius	0.00793 ±0.00021 R_{☉}
Surface gravity (log g)	8.64 ±0.03 cgs
Temperature	4557 ±63 K
Age	cooling age: 6.388 Gyr total age: 7.7+0.3 −0.4 Gyr

Other designations
- SDSS J231726.72+183049.6, EQ J2317+1830, Gaia DR2 2818957013992481280

Database references
SIMBAD	data

WD 2317+1830 (SDSS J231726.72+183049.6) is one of the first white dwarfs with lithium detected in its atmosphere. The white dwarf is surrounded by a debris disk and is actively accreting material. Researchers suggest that the presence of alkali metals indicates the accretion of crust material. Another work however cautions to use alkali metals as a single indicator of crust material. They suggest that such objects could be polluted by mantle material instead. An analysis in 2024 finds that the abundance of lithium is in agreement with Big Bang nucleosynthesis (BBN) and galactic nucleosynthesis. WD 2317+1830 likely was a star with sub-solar metallicity, which is evident from its old age, as well as from its thick disk or halo kinematics. This low metallicity means that the planetesimals that formed around this old white dwarf had a composition more similar to BBN abundances. The lithium-enhancement is not in agreement with the accretion of terrestrial continental crust material. The accretion of an exotic exoplanet is not ruled out, but the accretion of a primitive planetesimal is more likely. The accretion of an exomoon as a lithium source is excluded.

WD 2317+1830 was first discovered in 2021 from Gaia and SDSS data as a candidate white dwarf. A first spectral analysis was published in 2020, identifying it as a DZ white dwarf. In 2021 observations with the Gran Telescopio Canarias were published. The white dwarf is massive and has a mass of 1.00 ± 0.02 M_{☉}. The cooling age was determined to be 9.5±0.2 Gyrs and the total age is 9.7±0.2 Gyrs. A more recent work found a higher temperature and younger cooling age of about 6.4 Gyrs. The researchers detected sodium, lithium and weak calcium absorption. The researchers also detected infrared excess, indicative of a debris disk, around this white dwarf. The disk is inclined by 70°, has an inner disk temperature of 1,500 K and an outer disk temperature of 500 K. In the past WD 2317+1830 had a mass of 4.8 ± 0.2 M_{☉} and was likely a B-type star.

== See also ==
- List of exoplanets and planetary debris around white dwarfs
- WD J2356−209 is another cool white dwarf with sodium detected
- LSPM J0207+3331 is another old white dwarf with a disk detected
