= White dwarf cooling anomaly =

Astrophysical phenomenon

The white dwarf cooling anomaly is an additional cooling delay that has been observed for ultramassive forms of these compact stellar remnants. As a white dwarf cools, crystallization of the interior releases energy, slowing the cooling rate. However, the cooling rates modelled on this crystal formation process do not always match that of observed samples of ultramassive white dwarfs. Instead, sedimentation of more massive ions may provide the missing heat via the release of gravitational energy. As a consequence, some white dwarfs may be billions of years older than previously believed.

== Background ==
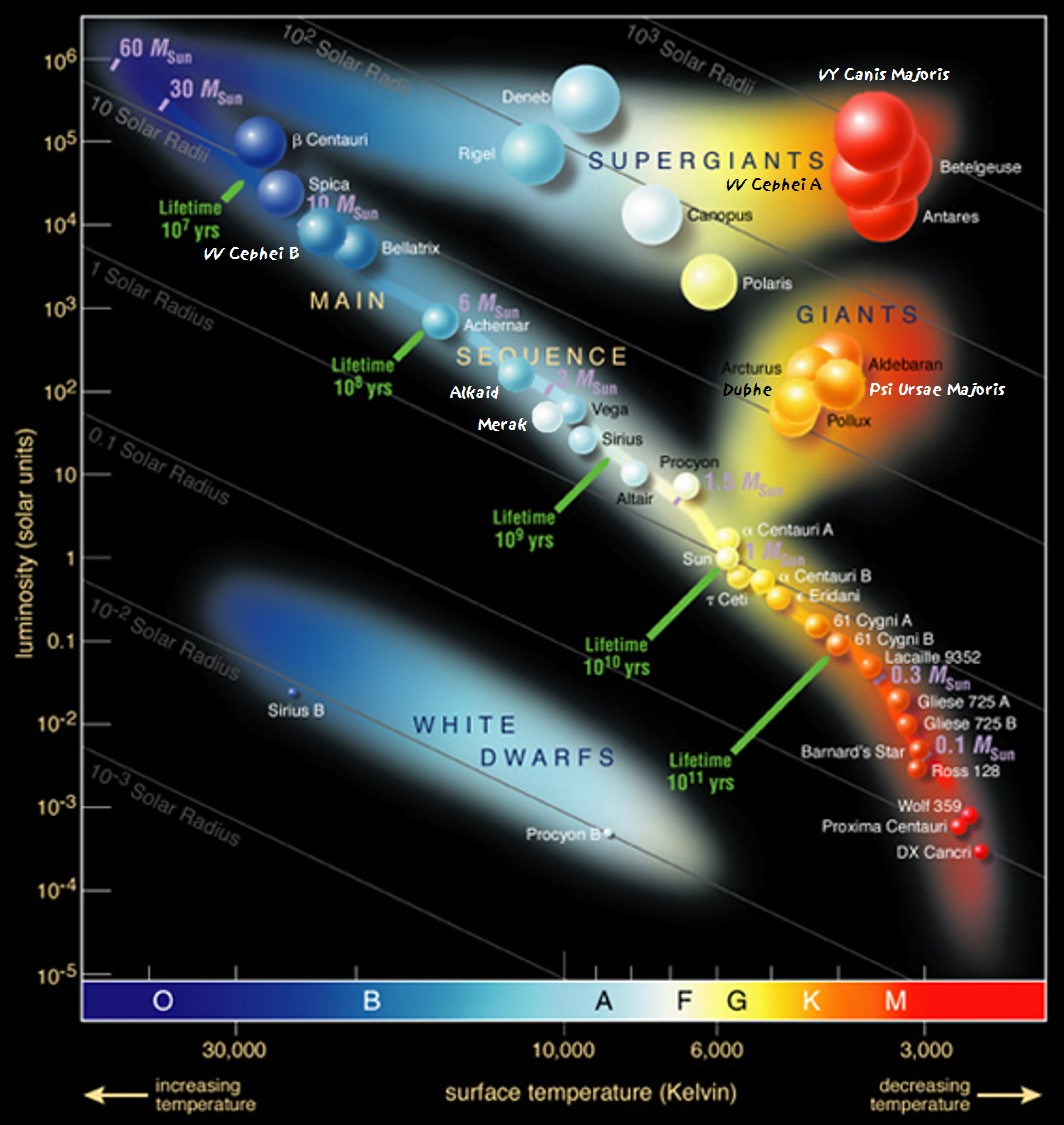
HR diagram showing the grouping of white dwarfs relative to other classes of stars

White dwarfs are stellar remnants that do not normally generate energy through thermonuclear fusion. Instead, they radiate away their remaining stored energy at a steadily decreasing rate. On the Hertzsprung–Russell diagram – a scatter plot of stellar effective temperature versus luminosity – this cooling can be viewed as following a sequence leading down and to the right over time. That is, the temperature and luminosity of the white dwarf will diminish over time as energy is lost.

At a certain point, within the cooling core of a carbon-oxygen white dwarf, electrostatic interactions will start to dominate over thermal motion, and the ions will crystallize into a lattice structure. The result of this process will be a release of energy, slowing the cooling rate. This will produce a pile-up on the HR diagram as the aging white dwarfs spend up to a billion years in the region where crystallization occurs. Additional heat is generated from gravitational energy due to element sedimentation in the crystallized region, further slowing the cooling process.

== Gaia data results ==
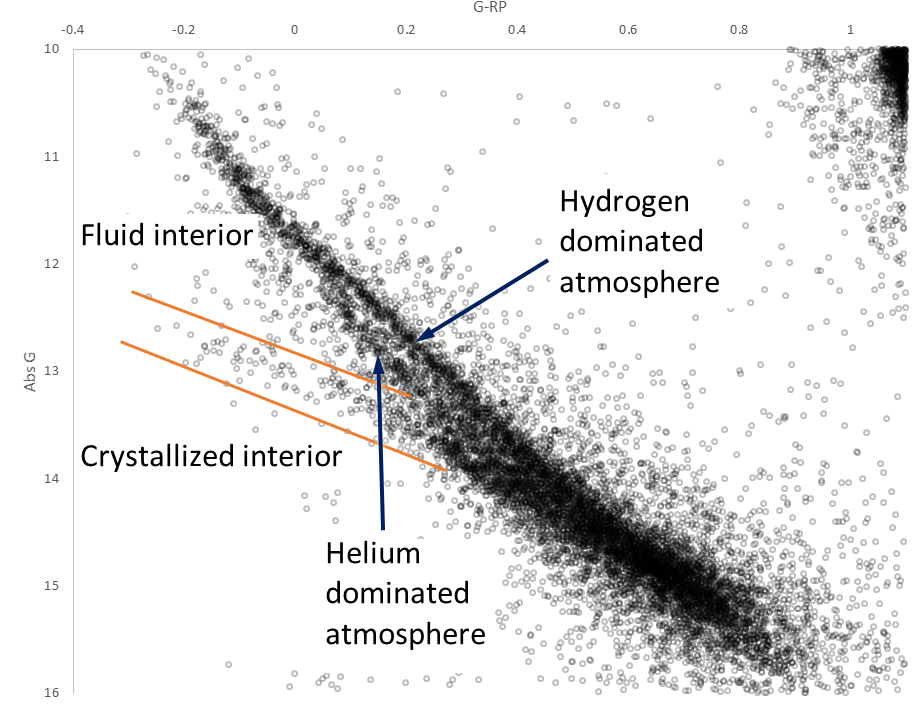
Gaia-based HR diagram of white dwarfs showing three branch-like groupings

In 2018, the second release of data from the Gaia astrometric space mission was made available to astronomers, providing precise location and photometric data for around 260,000 candidate white dwarfs. For the first time, this information provided data on the fundamental properties of these objects on a large scale. Among the signatures from these results was the detection of a pile-up on the HR diagram due to the release of latent heat from crystallization.

On the HR diagram for these stars, three branch-like groupings are visible, dubbed the A, B, and Q branches, corresponding to primary population (A), a second prominent feature (B), and a third feature that was initially dubbed "Q" to point out that the nature of this branch was in question when it was newly observed in 2018. Somewhat coincidentally, the A branch is strongly associated with a population of white dwarfs of spectral type DA, the B branch is correlated with a population of white dwarfs of spectral type DB, and the Q branch contains a significant number of white dwarfs of spectral type DQ (though many other spectral classifications are present on the Q branch as well). The first two are associated with white dwarfs having hydrogen-rich and helium-rich atmospheres, while the Q branch bunching is associated with ultramassive white dwarfs. The latter class includes oxygen-neon white dwarfs as well as the merger products of binary carbon-oxygen white dwarf systems, and the Q branch feature appears to align most closely with ultramassive crystallizing carbon-oxygen white dwarfs rather than the oxygen-neon white dwarfs previously expected in this regime.

The Q branch bunching is not associated with any normal cooling track, but is instead the result of a cooling delay. This pile-up of higher mass white dwarfs is narrower and more luminous than is predicted by standard crystallization models, suggesting an extra, anomalous cooling delay is at work. While standard models of crystallization predicted that this delay would be up to about 1 billion years, statistical inferences found that in about 7% of ultramassive white dwarfs, this additional cooling delay can last up to eight billion years.

== Neon-22 settling ==
It was proposed that settling of the neon-22 isotope could account for the cooling anomaly. This element is produced in stellar cores that generate energy from the CNO cycle, which is the dominant fusion process in ordinary main sequence stars with at least 1.3 times the mass of the Sun. The CNO cycle accumulates nitrogen-14, which is later converted to ^{22}Ne through fusion with helium. This neutron-heavy isotope of neon experiences a downward pressure in the degenerate interior of a carbon-oxygen white dwarf, causing it to settle toward the core. The initial gravitational energy potential of the neon isotope within a solar mass white dwarf is 6.8×10^{47} erg, which is sufficient to delay the cooling for about 8.9 billion years. The diffusion of the neon isotope is expected to occur in the liquid regions of the interior.

Based on diffusion calculations for solitary particles, an issue with this proposal is that the sedimentation rates will not be sufficient to account for the cooling delay. To increase the sedimentation rate, it was hypothesized that the ^{22}Ne ions form clusters, thereby allowing more rapid sinking. In a liquid state that is approaching crystallization, groups of neon ions could become more strongly coupled to each other compared to the surrounding mix of carbon and oxygen. Sinking clusters of at least 1,000 neon ions are needed to account for the required cooling delay of several billion years. The net result would be a rain of neon droplets that continually grow as they descend and merge with other neon drops. However, simulations of this hypothesis demonstrated that the formation of ^{22}Ne clusters can not take place at the low abundance levels found in typical carbon-oxygen white dwarfs.

As an alternative hypothesis, it was suggested that the crystallizing matter in a white dwarf could become depleted in ^{22}Ne compared to the surrounding liquid. If the neon depletion is large enough, these crystals are less dense than the surrounding liquid and would float upward away from the crystallized interior. The rising crystals eventually melt, leaving a distilled liquid enhanced in ^{22}Ne near the crystallization front. When the right phase separation conditions are met, the neon can then crystallize along with the carbon and oxygen, creating a layer that is rich in neon. If this distillation process begins when crystallization is first initiated in a white dwarf, the result is a neon-rich core and a large release of gravitational energy. A later start will produce a neon-rich shell closer to the surface, and thus a lower release of gravitational energy.

== Other proposals ==
Although lower in abundance than neon, the greater neutron excess of iron can produce double the heating per nucleus and a more rapid sedimentation. Assuming solar abundances, a solar-mass white dwarf will have 10^{−3} M_{☉} of the ^{56}Fe isotope. The sedimentation of even a fraction of this iron can generate 10^{−4} to 10^{−3} L_{☉} for a period of a billion years. However, the cooling delay from this process in a ultramassive white dwarfs is only expected to last for 100 million years, so it is insufficient by itself to explain the Q branch cooling anomaly. The precipitation of iron crystals can accumulate at the center, forming an iron core on the order of 100 km across. Such a core should be detectable using asteroseismology.

As a result of mass transfer, an evolving star can merge with its carbon-oxygen white dwarf companion. With a subgiant star having a helium-rich core, the merged star can fuse ^{22}Ne with helium to form ^{26}Mg. The mass fraction of the magnesium will steadily increase prior to the star becoming a white dwarf. As with the neon-22 isotope, the magnesium can then undergo a distillation process and be transported toward the core, releasing gravitational energy. The result can be a four billion year cooling delay, and may help explain the overabundance of older white dwarfs on the Q branch.
