= White dwarf =

Stellar core remnant

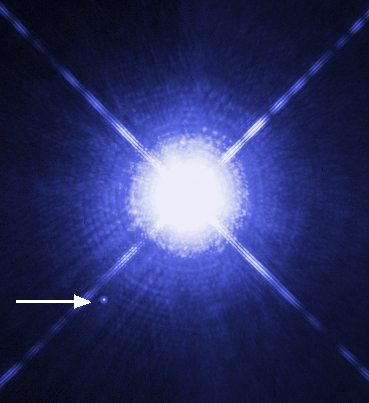
- Image of the Sirius system taken by the Hubble Space Telescope. Sirius B, which is the closest white dwarf to Earth, can be seen as a faint point of light to the lower left of the much brighter Sirius A.

Characteristics
- Type: Class of stellar remnant.
- Mass range: Up to 1.44 M_{☉}
- Temperature: 4000–40000+ K
- Average luminosity: 0.01-0.0001 L_{☉}

External links
- Media category
- Q5871

A white dwarf is a very dense type of star: in an Earth-sized volume, it packs a mass that is comparable to the Sun. A white dwarf radiates light from residual heat and eventual crystallization, not from nuclear fusion. Stars like the Sun, whose mass is not high enough to collapse into a neutron star or black hole, are expected to become white dwarf stars later in their evolution. The nearest known white dwarf is Sirius B, at 8.6 light years, the smaller component of the Sirius binary star.

In 1910, Henry Norris Russell, Edward Charles Pickering and Williamina Fleming discovered that, despite being a dim star, 40 Eridani B was of spectral type A, or white. This would become known as the first white dwarf. The name white dwarf was coined by Willem Jacob Luyten in 1922. In 1931 Subrahmanyan Chandrasekhar developed a physical model of white dwarfs and he won the 1983 Nobel Prize in Physics for studies in the evolution of stars.

These compact stars are composed mostly of a highly compressed form of matter. The composition of the white dwarf produced will depend on the initial mass of the star. Once formed, the material in a white dwarf no longer undergoes fusion reactions and thus lacks a heat source to support it against gravitational collapse. Instead, it is supported only by electron degeneracy pressure, causing it to be extremely dense. The physics of degeneracy yields a maximum mass for a non-rotating white dwarf, the Chandrasekhar limit— approximately 1.44 times the mass of the Sun — beyond which electron degeneracy pressure cannot support it. Observed white dwarf masses are largely between 0.5 and 0.7 M_{☉}.

White dwarfs are very hot when they form, but cool gradually as they radiate their energy. This radiation, which initially has a high color temperature, lessens and reddens over very long timespans. White dwarfs may exist for as long as 10^{38} years.

== History ==
=== Discovery ===
The first white dwarf discovered was in the triple star system of 40 Eridani, which contains the relatively bright main sequence star 40 Eridani A, orbited at a distance by the closer binary system of the white dwarf 40 Eridani B and the main sequence red dwarf 40 Eridani C. The pair 40 Eridani B/C was discovered by William Herschel on 31 January 1783. In 1910, Henry Norris Russell, Edward Charles Pickering and Williamina Fleming discovered that, despite being a dim star, 40 Eridani B was of spectral type A, or white. This star was far out of the normal pattern when Russell first created his now famous luminosity (brightness) versus spectral type (color) diagram. Publicly Russell suggested that the spectral type may not be correct. However the spectral type of 40 Eridani B was independently confirmed in 1914 by Walter Adams. In 1939, Russell looked back on the discovery and noted that Pickering had suggested that such exceptions lead to breakthroughs and in this case it led to the discovery of white dwarfs.

The white dwarf companion of Sirius, Sirius B, was next to be discovered. During the nineteenth century, positional measurements of some stars became precise enough to measure small changes in their location. Friedrich Bessel used position measurements to determine that the stars Sirius (α Canis Majoris) and Procyon (α Canis Minoris) were changing their positions periodically. In 1844 he predicted that both stars had unseen companions. Bessel roughly estimated the period of the companion of Sirius to be about half a century; C.A.F. Peters computed an orbit for it in 1851. It was not until 31 January 1862 that Alvan Graham Clark observed a previously unseen star close to Sirius, later identified as the predicted companion. Adams announced in 1915 that he had found the spectrum of Sirius B to be similar to that of Sirius.

In 1917, Adriaan van Maanen discovered van Maanen's Star, an isolated white dwarf. These three white dwarfs, the first discovered, are the so-called classical white dwarfs.

In 1922, Willem Luyten published a series of three papers on faint white stars that had high proper motion, meaning they were low-luminosity white stars close to the Earth. In his third paper he used the term dwarf; the term was later popularized by Arthur Eddington as white dwarf. Eighteen white dwarfs had been discovered by 1939. Luyten and others continued to search for white dwarfs in the 1940s. By 1950, over a hundred were known, and by 1999, over 2000 were known. Since then the Sloan Digital Sky Survey has found over 9000 white dwarfs, mostly new.

=== Theory development ===
The extreme density of white dwarf stars was initially a theoretical puzzle. If a star is in a binary system, as is the case for Sirius B or 40 Eridani B, it is possible to estimate its mass from observations of the binary orbit. This was done for Sirius B by 1910, yielding a mass estimate of 0.94 M_{☉} (which compares well with a more modern estimate of 1.00 M_{☉}). Since hotter bodies radiate more energy than colder ones, a star's surface brightness can be estimated from its effective surface temperature, and star's spectrum gives its temperature. If the star's distance is known, its absolute luminosity can also be estimated. From the absolute luminosity and distance, the star's surface area and its radius can be calculated. Reasoning of this sort led to the realization, puzzling to astronomers at the time, that due to their relatively high temperature and relatively low absolute luminosity, Sirius B and 40 Eridani B must be very dense. When Ernst Öpik estimated the density of visual binary stars in 1916, he found that 40 Eridani B had a density of over 25000 times that of the Sun, which was so high that he called it "impossible". As Eddington put it in 1927:

We learn about the stars by receiving and interpreting the messages which their light brings to us. The message of the companion of Sirius when it was decoded ran: "I am composed of material 3000 times denser than anything you have ever come across; a ton of my material would be a little nugget that you could put in a matchbox." What reply can one make to such a message? The reply which most of us made in 1914 was—"Shut up. Don't talk nonsense."

Such densities are possible because white dwarf material is not composed of atoms joined by chemical bonds, but rather consists of a plasma of unbound nuclei and electrons. There is therefore no obstacle to placing nuclei closer than normally allowed by electron orbitals limited by normal matter. Eddington wondered what would happen when this plasma cooled and the energy to keep the atoms ionized was no longer sufficient. This paradox was resolved by R. H. Fowler in 1926 by an application of the newly devised quantum mechanics. Since electrons obey the Pauli exclusion principle, no two electrons can occupy the same state, and they must obey Fermi–Dirac statistics, also introduced in 1926 to determine the statistical distribution of particles that satisfy the Pauli exclusion principle. At zero temperature, therefore, electrons cannot all occupy the lowest-energy, or ground, state; some of them would have to occupy higher-energy states, forming a band of lowest-available energy states, the Fermi sea. This state of the electrons, called degenerate, meant that a white dwarf could cool to zero temperature and still possess high energy.

The existence of a limiting mass that no white dwarf can exceed without collapsing to a neutron star is another consequence of being supported by electron degeneracy pressure. Such limiting masses were calculated for cases of an idealized, constant density star in 1929 by Wilhelm Anderson and in 1930 by Edmund C. Stoner. This value was corrected by considering hydrostatic equilibrium for the density profile, and the presently known value of the limit was first published in 1931 by Subrahmanyan Chandrasekhar in his paper "The Maximum Mass of Ideal White Dwarfs". For a non-rotating white dwarf, it is equal to approximately 5.7 M_{☉} / μ_{e}^{2}, where μ_{e} is the average molecular weight per electron of the star, leading to the commonly quoted value of 1.4 M_{☉}. (Near the beginning of the 20th century, there was reason to believe that stars were composed chiefly of heavy elements, so, in his 1931 paper, Chandrasekhar set the average molecular weight per electron, μ_{e}, equal to 2.5, giving a limit of 0.91 M_{☉}.) Together with William Alfred Fowler, Chandrasekhar received the Nobel Prize for this and other work in 1983. The limiting mass is now called the Chandrasekhar limit.

== Occurrence ==
Galactic models suggest the Milky Way galaxy currently contains about ten billion white dwarfs. There are currently thought to be eight white dwarfs among the one hundred star systems nearest to the Sun. The nearest and brightest known white dwarf is Sirius B, at 8.6 light years, the smaller component of the Sirius binary star.

The population of white dwarf stars is expected to grow. Existing stars with masses from about 0.07 to 10 M_{☉} include over 97% of the stars in the Milky Way and these stars will evolve into white dwarfs.

== Composition and structure ==
Although white dwarfs are known with estimated masses as low as 0.17 M_{☉} and as high as 1.33 M_{☉}, the mass distribution is strongly peaked at 0.6 M_{☉}, and the majority lie between 0.5 and 0.7 M_{☉}. The estimated radii of observed white dwarfs are typically 0.8–2% the radius of the Sun; this is comparable to the Earth's radius of approximately 0.9% solar radius. A white dwarf, then, packs mass comparable to the Sun's into a volume that is typically one millionth of the Sun's; the average density of matter in a white dwarf must therefore be, very roughly, 1000000 times greater than the average density of the Sun, or approximately 10^{6} g/cm^{3}, or 1 tonne per cubic centimetre. A typical white dwarf has a density of between 10^{4} and 10^{7} g/cm^{3}. White dwarfs are composed of one of the densest forms of matter known, surpassed only by other compact stars such as neutron stars and the hypothetical quark stars.

Material	Density [kg/m^{3}]	Notes
Water (liquid)	1000	At STP
Osmium	22610	Near room temperature
The core of the Sun	c. 150000	
White dwarf	1×10^{9}	
Atomic nuclei	2.3×10^{17}	Does not depend strongly on size of nucleus
Neutron star core	8.4×10^{16} – 1×10^{18}	

At these densities the nuclei within the star are much closer than nuclei in ordinary matter. Two nuclei in a white dwarf are separated by about 1.2×10^{−12} m, substantially less than a Bohr radius, 5.3×10^{−11} m, the rough size of a hydrogen atom. The white dwarf matter is pressure ionized: there is no room for bound electron orbitals. Rather than a hot thermal gas of atoms like the core of the Sun, the heat in the core of a white dwarf is associated with vibrating nuclei and the gas-like aspect providing pressure is due to the free electrons.

This unusual source of pressure is known as electron degeneracy pressure, a consequence of quantum mechanics. The uncertainty principle requires the product of position uncertainty, $\Delta x$, and momentum uncertainty, $\Delta p_x$, to be larger than half of the reduced Planck constant: $\Delta x \times \Delta p_x > \hbar/2.$ If the position uncertainty is small, the momentum uncertainty must increase. This uncertainty ultimately derives from the Pauli principle of quantum mechanics that says no two electrons will occupy the same quantum state. Qualitatively, the electrons resist being forced into a single place and this force counteracts the gravitational force compressing the star.

The balanced pressure at the center of a white dwarf will be on the order of 1.5 million times the pressure in the center of the Sun. The central temperature will exceed 10 million K. While these conditions would fuse hydrogen the low luminosity of white dwarf stars implies the necessary nuclei are not present.

=== Core types ===
A typical white dwarf star, a CO white dwarf, is 99% carbon and oxygen by mass, with the remainder being a thin layer of He and H. Main sequence stars close to the upper mass limit of 10 M_{☉} are thought to fuse carbon into neon, forming O-Ne white dwarf stars. Very light stars, below 0.6 M_{☉} never fuse He into carbon and oxygen so they form He-core white dwarfs. It takes more time than the age of the universe for a light star to burn through its fuel, so any observed He-core white dwarfs are expected to result from mass loss to a companion in an interacting binary star system.

If a carbon-oxygen white dwarf accreted enough matter to reach the Chandrasekhar limit of about 1.44 solar masses (for a non-rotating star), it would no longer be able to support the bulk of its mass through electron degeneracy pressure and, in the absence of nuclear reactions, would begin to collapse. The current view is that this limit is not normally attained; increasing temperature and density inside the core ignite carbon fusion as the star approaches the limit (to within about 1%) before collapse is initiated. In contrast, for a core primarily composed of oxygen, neon and magnesium, the collapsing white dwarf will typically form a neutron star. In this case, only a fraction of the star's mass will be ejected during the collapse.

If a white dwarf star accumulates sufficient material from a stellar companion to raise its core temperature enough to ignite carbon fusion, it will undergo runaway nuclear fusion, completely disrupting it. There are three avenues by which this detonation is theorised to happen: stable accretion of material from a companion, the collision of two white dwarfs, or accretion that causes ignition in a shell that then ignites the core. The dominant mechanism by which Type Ia supernovae are produced remains unclear. Despite this uncertainty in how Type Ia supernovae are produced, Type Ia supernovae have very uniform properties and are useful standard candles over intergalactic distances. Some calibrations are required to compensate for the gradual change in properties or different frequencies of abnormal luminosity supernovae at high redshift, and for small variations in brightness identified by light curve shape or spectrum.

=== Mass–radius relationship ===
The relationship between the mass and radius of white dwarfs can be estimated using the nonrelativistic Fermi gas equation of state, which gives

$$\frac{R}{R_\odot} \approx 0.012\left ( \frac{M}{M_\odot}\right )^{-1/3} \left (\frac{\mu_e}{2}\right)^{-5/3},$$

where R is the radius, M is the mass of the white dwarf, and the subscript $\odot$ indicates the Sun; therefore ${R} / {R_\odot}$ is the radius in units of solar radius and ${M} / {M_\odot}$ is the mass in units of solar mass. The chemical potential, $\mu_e$ is a thermodynamic property giving the change in energy as one electron is added or removed; it relates to the composition of the star. Numerical treatment of more complete models have been tested against observational data with good agreement.

Since this analysis uses the non-relativistic formula p^{2} / 2m for the kinetic energy, it is non-relativistic. When the electron velocity in a white dwarf is close to the speed of light, the kinetic energy formula approaches pc where c is the speed of light, and it can be shown that the Fermi gas model has no stable equilibrium in the ultrarelativistic limit. In particular, this analysis yields the maximum mass of a white dwarf, which is:

$$M_{\rm limit} \approx 1.46\left (\frac{\mu_e}{2}\right)^{-2}$$

The observation of many white dwarf stars implies that either they started with masses similar to the Sun or something dramatic happened to reduce their mass.

Radius–mass relations for a model white dwarf. M_{limit} is denoted as M_{Ch}.

For a more accurate computation of the mass-radius relationship and limiting mass of a white dwarf, one must compute the equation of state that describes the relationship between density and pressure in the white dwarf material. If the density and pressure are both set equal to functions of the radius from the center of the star, the system of equations consisting of the hydrostatic equation together with the equation of state can then be solved to find the structure of the white dwarf at equilibrium. In the non-relativistic case, the radius is inversely proportional to the cube root of the mass. Relativistic corrections will alter the result so that the radius becomes zero at a finite value of the mass. This is the limiting value of the mass—called the Chandrasekhar limit—at which the white dwarf can no longer be supported by electron degeneracy pressure. The graph on the right shows the result of such a computation. It shows how radius varies with mass for non-relativistic (blue curve) and relativistic (green curve) models of a white dwarf. Both models treat the white dwarf as a cold Fermi gas in hydrostatic equilibrium. The average molecular weight per electron, μ_{e}, has been set equal to 2. Radius is measured in standard solar radii and mass in standard solar masses.

These computations all assume that the white dwarf is non-rotating. If the white dwarf is rotating, the equation of hydrostatic equilibrium must be modified to take into account the centrifugal pseudo-force arising from working in a rotating frame. For a uniformly rotating white dwarf, the limiting mass increases only slightly. If the star is allowed to rotate nonuniformly, and viscosity is neglected, then, as was pointed out by Fred Hoyle in 1947, there is no limit to the mass for which it is possible for a model white dwarf to be in static equilibrium. Not all of these model stars will be dynamically stable.

Rotating white dwarfs and the estimates of their diameter in terms of the angular velocity of rotation has been treated in the rigorous mathematical literature. The fine structure of the free boundary of white dwarfs has also been analysed mathematically rigorously.

=== Radiation and cooling ===

White dwarfs have low luminosity and therefore occupy a strip at the bottom of the Hertzsprung–Russell diagram, a graph of stellar luminosity versus color or temperature. They should not be confused with low-luminosity objects at the low-mass end of the main sequence, such as the hydrogen-fusing red dwarfs, whose cores are supported in part by thermal pressure, or the even lower-temperature brown dwarfs. The visible radiation emitted by white dwarfs varies over a wide color range, from the whitish-blue color of an O-, B- or A-type main sequence star to the yellow-orange of a late K- or early M-type star. White dwarf luminosity varies over 7 orders of magnitude, from over 100 times that of the Sun to under 1/ 10000 that of the Sun. Assuming the Stefan–Boltzmann law, relating luminosity to the fourth power of the effective surface temperature, white dwarf effective surface temperatures extend from over 150000 K to barely under 4000 K. Hot white dwarfs, with surface temperatures in excess of 30000 K, have been observed to be sources of soft (i.e., lower-energy) X-rays. This enables the composition and structure of their atmospheres to be studied by soft X-ray and extreme ultraviolet observations.

White dwarfs also radiate neutrinos through the Urca process. This process has more effect on hotter and younger white dwarfs. Because neutrinos can pass easily through stellar plasma, they can drain energy directly from the dwarf's interior; this mechanism is the dominant contribution to cooling for approximately the first 20 million years of a white dwarf's existence.

The degenerate matter that makes up the bulk of a white dwarf has a very low opacity, because any absorption of a photon requires that an electron must transition to a higher empty state, which may not be possible as the energy of the photon may not be a match for the possible quantum states available to that electron, hence radiative heat transfer within a white dwarf is low, but it has a high thermal conductivity. As a result, the interior of the white dwarf maintains an almost uniform temperature as it cools down, starting at approximately 10^{8} K shortly after the formation of the white dwarf and reaching less than 10^{6} K for the coolest known white dwarfs. An outer shell of non-degenerate matter sits on top of the degenerate core. The outermost layers, which are cooler than the interior, radiate roughly as a black body. A white dwarf remains visible for a long time, as its tenuous outer atmosphere slowly radiates the thermal content of the degenerate interior.

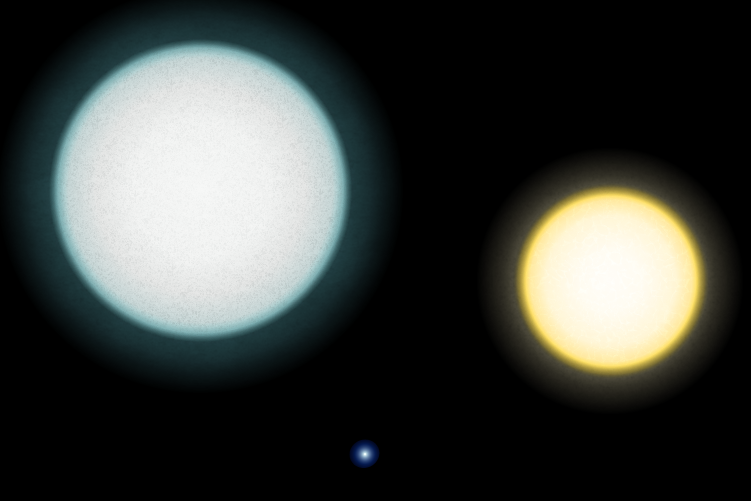
A comparison between the white dwarf IK Pegasi B (center), its A-class companion IK Pegasi A (left) and the Sun (right). This white dwarf has a surface temperature of 35500 K.

As was explained by Leon Mestel in 1952, unless the white dwarf accretes matter from a companion star or other source, its radiation comes from its stored heat, which is not replenished. White dwarfs have an extremely small surface area to radiate this heat from, so they cool gradually, remaining hot for a long time. As a white dwarf cools, its surface temperature decreases, the radiation that it emits reddens, and its luminosity decreases. Since the white dwarf has no energy sink other than radiation, it follows that its cooling slows with time. The rate of cooling has been estimated for a carbon white dwarf of 0.59 M_{☉} with a hydrogen atmosphere. After initially taking approximately 1.5 billion years to cool to a surface temperature of 7140 K, cooling approximately 500 more kelvins to 6590 K takes around 0.3 billion years, but the next two steps of around 500 kelvins (to 6030 K and 5550 K) take first 0.4 and then 1.1 billion years.

Most observed white dwarfs have relatively high surface temperatures, between 8000 K and 40000 K. However this is a selection effect: hotter, more luminous white dwarfs are easier to observe. A white dwarf spends more of its lifetime at cooler temperatures: more cool white dwarfs than hot white dwarfs exist. This trend stops at extremely cool white dwarfs; few white dwarfs are observed with surface temperatures below 4000 K, and one of the coolest so far observed, WD J2147–4035, has a surface temperature of approximately 3050 K. The reason for this is that the Universe's age is finite; there has not been enough time for white dwarfs to cool below this temperature. The white dwarf luminosity function can therefore be used to find the time when stars started to form in a region; an estimate for the age of our galactic disk found in this way is 8 billion years. A white dwarf will eventually, in many trillions of years, cool and become a non-radiating black dwarf in approximate thermal equilibrium with its surroundings and with the cosmic background radiation. No black dwarfs are thought to exist yet.

At very low temperatures (<4000 K) white dwarfs with hydrogen in their atmosphere will be affected by collision induced absorption (CIA) of hydrogen molecules colliding with helium atoms. This affects the optical red and infrared brightness of white dwarfs with a hydrogen or mixed hydrogen-helium atmosphere. This makes old white dwarfs with this kind of atmosphere bluer than the main cooling sequence. White dwarfs with hydrogen-poor atmospheres, such as WD J2147–4035, are less affected by CIA and therefore have a yellow to orange color.

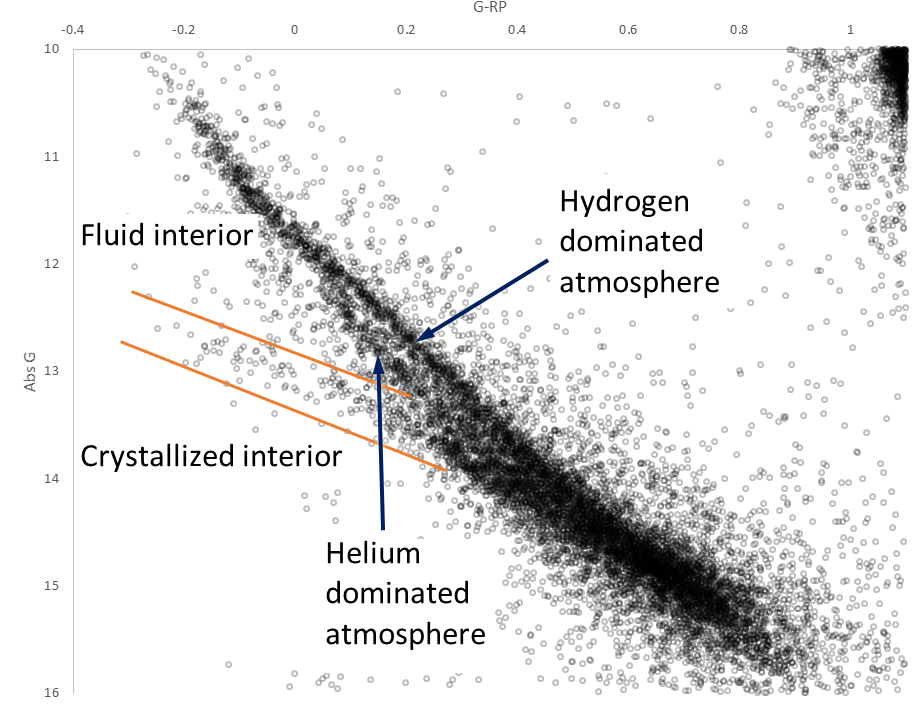
The white dwarf cooling sequence seen by ESA's Gaia mission. The axes are absolute magnitude in the G-band vs. a color index G-band magnitude minus RP (Gaia red photometer) magnitude

White dwarf core material is a completely ionized plasma—a mixture of nuclei and electrons—that is initially in a fluid state. It was theoretically predicted in the 1960s that at a late stage of cooling, it should crystallize into a solid state, starting at its center. The crystal structure is thought to be a body-centered cubic lattice. In 1995 it was suggested that asteroseismological observations of pulsating white dwarfs yielded a potential test of the crystallization theory, and in 2004, observations were made that suggested approximately 90% of the mass of BPM 37093 had crystallized. Other work gives a crystallized mass fraction of between 32% and 82%.

As a white dwarf core undergoes crystallization into a solid phase, latent heat is released, which provides a source of thermal energy that delays its cooling. Another possible mechanism that was suggested to explain this cooling anomaly in some types of white dwarfs is a solid–liquid distillation process: the crystals formed in the core are buoyant and float up, thereby displacing heavier liquid downward, thus causing a net release of gravitational energy. Chemical fractionation between the ionic species in the plasma mixture can release a similar or even greater amount of energy. This energy release was first confirmed in 2019 after the identification of a pile up in the cooling sequence of more than 15000 white dwarfs observed with the Gaia satellite.

Low-mass helium white dwarfs (mass < 0.20 M_{☉}), often referred to as extremely low-mass white dwarfs (ELM WDs), are formed in binary systems. As a result of their hydrogen-rich envelopes, residual hydrogen burning via the CNO cycle may keep these white dwarfs hot for hundreds of millions of years. In addition, they remain in a bloated proto-white dwarf stage for up to 2 Gyr before they reach the cooling track.

=== Atmosphere and spectra ===
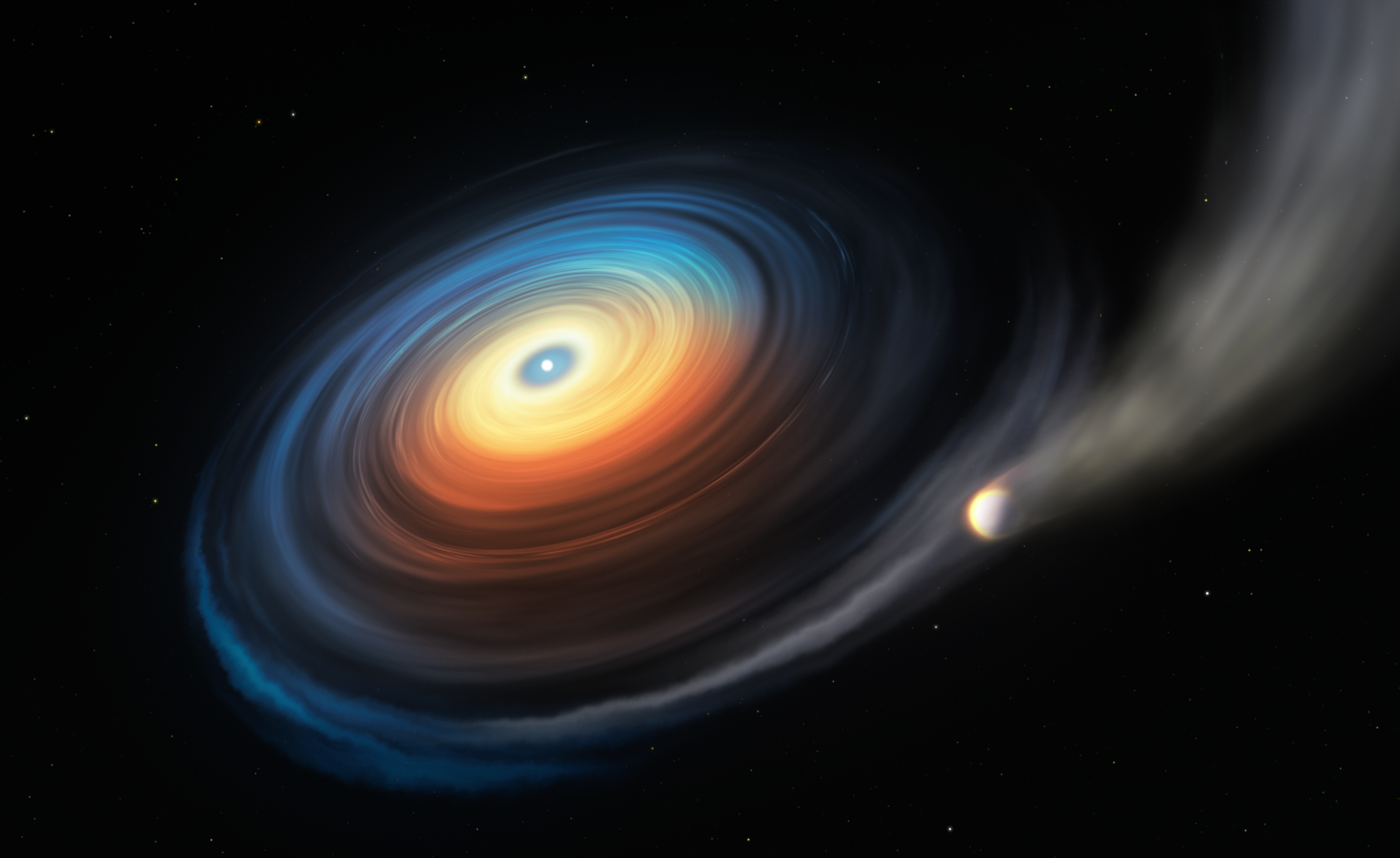
Artist's impression of the WD J0914+1914 system

Although most white dwarfs are thought to be composed of carbon and oxygen, spectroscopy typically shows that their emitted light comes from an atmosphere that is observed to be either hydrogen or helium dominated. The dominant element is usually at least 1000 times more abundant than all other elements. As explained by Schatzman in the 1940s, the high surface gravity is thought to cause this purity by gravitationally separating the atmosphere so that heavy elements are below and the lighter above. This atmosphere, the only part of the white dwarf visible to us, is thought to be the top of an envelope that is a residue of the star's envelope in the AGB phase and may also contain material accreted from the interstellar medium. The envelope is believed to consist of a helium-rich layer with mass no more than 1/ 100 of the star's total mass, which, if the atmosphere is hydrogen-dominated, is overlain by a hydrogen-rich layer with mass approximately 1/ 10000 of the star's total mass.

Although thin, these outer layers determine the thermal evolution of the white dwarf. The degenerate electrons in the bulk of a white dwarf conduct heat well. Most of a white dwarf's mass is therefore at almost the same temperature (isothermal), and it is also hot: a white dwarf with surface temperature between 8000 K and 16000 K will have a core temperature between approximately 5000000 K and 20000000 K. The white dwarf is kept from cooling very quickly only by its outer layers' opacity to radiation.

White dwarf spectral types
Primary or secondary features
A	H lines present
B	He^{I} lines
C	Continuous spectrum; no lines
O	He^{II} lines, accompanied by He^{I} or H lines
Z	Metal lines
Q	Carbon lines present
X	Unclear or unclassifiable spectrum
Secondary features only
P	Magnetic white dwarf with detectable polarization
H	Magnetic white dwarf without detectable polarization
E	Emission lines present
V	Variable

The first attempt to classify white dwarf spectra appears to have been by G.P. Kuiper in 1941, and various classification schemes have been proposed and used since then. The system currently in use was introduced by Edward M. Sion, Jesse L. Greenstein and their coauthors in 1983 and has been subsequently revised several times. It classifies a spectrum by a symbol that consists of an initial D, a letter describing the primary feature of the spectrum followed by an optional sequence of letters describing secondary features of the spectrum (as shown in the adjacent table), and a temperature index number, computed by dividing 50400 K by the effective temperature. For example, a white dwarf with only He^{I} lines in its spectrum and an effective temperature of 15000 K could be given the classification of "DB3", or, if warranted by the precision of the temperature measurement, "DB3.5". Likewise, a white dwarf with a polarized magnetic field, an effective temperature of 17000 K, and a spectrum dominated by He^{I} lines that also had hydrogen features could be given the classification of DBAP3. The symbols "?" and ":" may also be used if the correct classification is uncertain.

White dwarfs whose primary spectral classification is DA have hydrogen-dominated atmospheres. They make up the majority, approximately 80%, of all observed white dwarfs. The next class in number is of DBs, approximately 16%. The hot, above 15000 K, DQ class (roughly 0.1%) have carbon-dominated atmospheres. Those classified as DB, DC, DO, DZ, and cool DQ have helium-dominated atmospheres. Assuming that carbon and metals are not present, which spectral classification is seen depends on the effective temperature. Between approximately 100000 K to 45000 K, the spectrum will be classified DO, dominated by singly ionized helium. From 30000 K to 12000 K, the spectrum will be DB, showing neutral helium lines, and below about 12000 K, the spectrum will be featureless and classified DC.

Molecular hydrogen (H_{2}) has been detected in spectra of the atmospheres of some white dwarfs. While theoretical work suggests that some types of white dwarfs may have stellar corona, searches at X-ray and radio wavelengths, where coronae are most easily detected, have been unsuccessful.

A few white dwarfs have been observed to have inhomogeneous atmosphere with one side dominated by hydrogen and the other side dominated by helium.

White dwarfs' dense atmosphere results in extreme broadening of absorption lines. While most white dwarfs are expected to be white, some white dwarfs atmospheres contain carbon or other vaporized metals which absorb some frequencies of light, causing the star to shine with unusual colours, such as pink or green.

==== Metal-rich white dwarfs ====
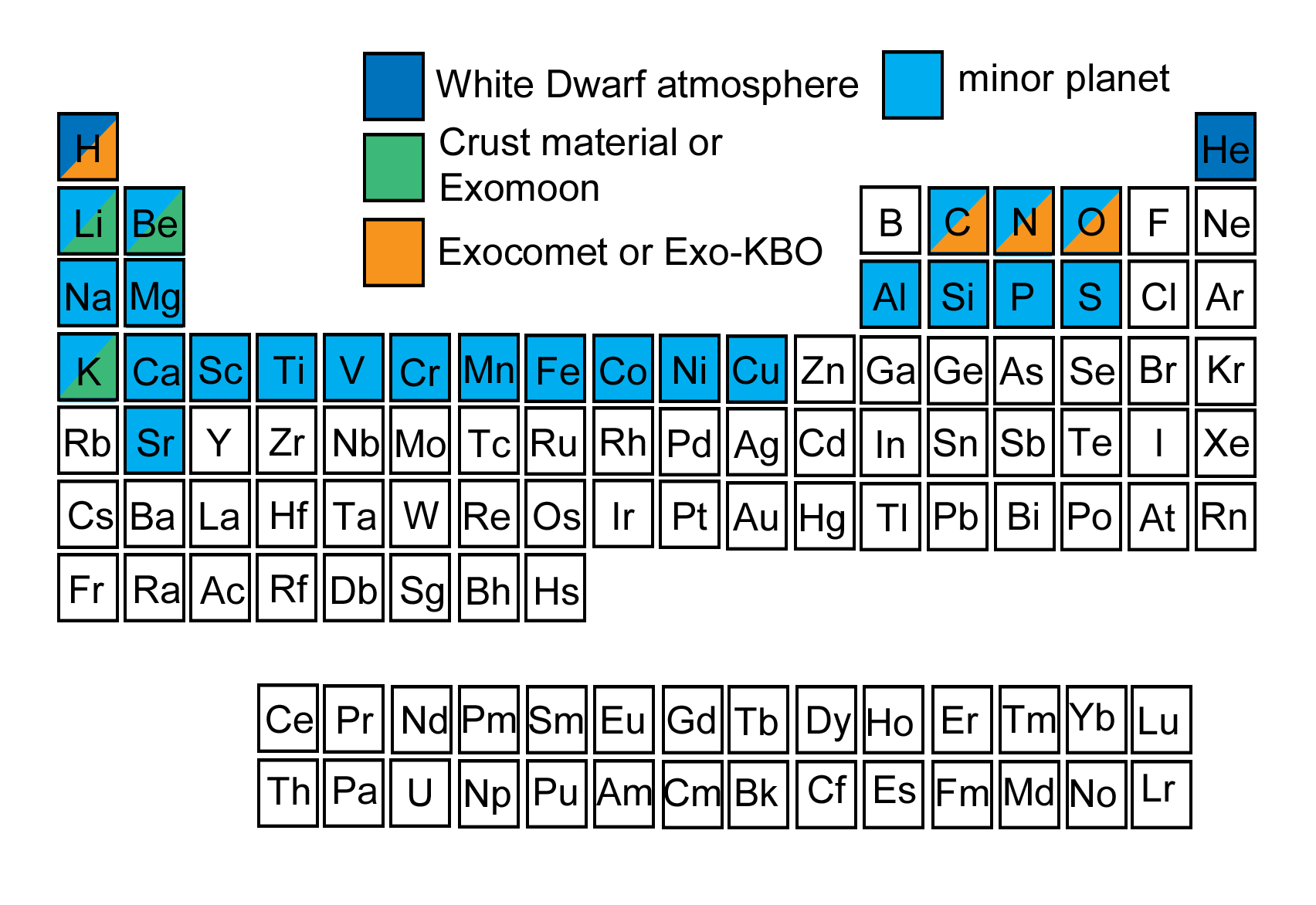
Elements discovered in the atmosphere of white dwarfs colder than 25000 K.

Around 25–33% of white dwarfs have metal lines in their spectra, which is notable because any heavy elements in a white dwarf should sink into the star's interior in just a small fraction of the star's lifetime. The prevailing explanation for metal-rich white dwarfs is that they have recently accreted rocky planetesimals. The bulk composition of the accreted object can be measured from the strengths of the metal lines. For example, a 2015 study of the white dwarf Ton 345 concluded that its metal abundances were consistent with those of a differentiated, rocky planet whose mantle had been eroded by the host star's wind during its asymptotic giant branch phase. Mass accretion rates may also be estimated from spectral lines and constrained via X-ray emission, assuming equal rates of accretion and diffusion, however this equilibrium may be complicated by mixing processes within the white dwarf's surface layers.

=== Magnetic field ===
Magnetic fields in white dwarfs with a strength at the surface of c. 1 million gauss (100 teslas) were predicted by P. M. S. Blackett in 1947 as a consequence of a physical law he had proposed, which stated that an uncharged, rotating body should generate a magnetic field proportional to its angular momentum. This putative law, sometimes called the Blackett effect, was never generally accepted, and by the 1950s even Blackett felt it had been refuted. In the 1960s, it was proposed that white dwarfs might have magnetic fields due to conservation of total surface magnetic flux that existed in its progenitor star phase. A surface magnetic field of c. 100 gauss (0.01 T) in the progenitor star would thus become a surface magnetic field of c. 100 × 100^{2} = 1 million gauss (100 T) once the star's radius had shrunk by a factor of 100. The first magnetic white dwarf to be discovered was GJ 742 (also known as GRW +70 8247), which was identified by James Kemp, John Swedlund, John Landstreet and Roger Angel in 1970 to host a magnetic field by its emission of circularly polarized light. It is thought to have a surface field of approximately 300 million gauss (30 kT).

Since 1970, magnetic fields have been discovered in well over 200 white dwarfs, ranging from 2×10^{3} to 10^{9} gauss (0.2 T to 100 kT). Many of the presently known magnetic white dwarfs are identified by low-resolution spectroscopy, which is able to reveal the presence of a magnetic field of 1 megagauss or more. Thus the basic identification process also sometimes results in discovery of magnetic fields. White dwarf magnetic fields may also be measured without spectral lines, using the techniques of broadband circular polarimetry, or maybe through measurement of their frequencies of radio emission via the electron cyclotron maser. It has been estimated that at least 10% of white dwarfs have fields in excess of 1 million gauss (100 T). The magnetic fields in a white dwarf may allow for the existence of a new type of chemical bond, perpendicular paramagnetic bonding, in addition to ionic and covalent bonds, though detecting molecules bonded in this way is expected to be difficult.

The highly magnetized white dwarf in the binary system AR Scorpii was identified in 2016 as the first pulsar in which the compact object is a white dwarf instead of a neutron star. A second white dwarf pulsar was discovered in 2023.

== Variability ==
Types of pulsating white dwarf
DAV (GCVS: ZZA)	DA spectral type, having only hydrogen absorption lines in its spectrum
DBV (GCVS: ZZB)	DB spectral type, having only helium absorption lines in its spectrum
GW Vir (GCVS: ZZO)	Atmosphere mostly C, He and O; may be divided into DOV and PNNV stars

Early calculations suggested that there might be white dwarfs whose luminosity varied with a period of around 10 seconds, but searches in the 1960s failed to observe this. The first variable white dwarf found was HL Tau 76; in 1965 and 1966, and was observed to vary with a period of approximately 12.5 minutes. The reason for this period being longer than predicted is that the variability of HL Tau 76, like that of the other pulsating variable white dwarfs known, arises from non-radial gravity wave pulsations. Known types of pulsating white dwarf include the DAV, or ZZ Ceti, stars, including HL Tau 76, with hydrogen-dominated atmospheres and the spectral type DA; DBV, or V777 Her, stars, with helium-dominated atmospheres and the spectral type DB; and GW Vir stars, sometimes subdivided into DOV and PNNV stars, with atmospheres dominated by helium, carbon, and oxygen. GW Vir stars are not, strictly speaking, white dwarfs, but are stars that are in a position on the Hertzsprung–Russell diagram between the asymptotic giant branch and the white dwarf region. They may be called pre-white dwarfs. These variables all exhibit small (1%–30%) variations in light output, arising from a superposition of vibrational modes with periods of hundreds to thousands of seconds. Observation of these variations gives asteroseismological evidence about the interiors of white dwarfs.

== Formation ==
After the hydrogen-fusing period of a main-sequence star of low or intermediate mass ends, such a star will expand onto the red giant branch, and eventually to the asymptotic giant branch with an outer hydrogen shell fusing to helium and an expanding helium shell that fuses to create a carbon and oxygen core by the triple-alpha process. Alternate fusing of the helium shell and hydrogen shells creates thermal pulses; these pulses combine with convective currents to create dust grains that are driven outward by radiation pressure creating strong stellar winds. The ejected mass forms a planetary nebula leaving behind a core, which is the remnant white dwarf. A white dwarf radiates light from residual heat, not from nuclear fusion.

=== Stars with very low mass ===
White dwarf stars with less than 25% of a solar mass are all found in binary star systems. The proportion of white dwarfs in binary systems declines to 34% for masses in the range 0.5–0.75 M_{☉}. These objects all have helium cores. It is thought that, over a lifespan that considerably exceeds the age of the universe (c. 13.8 billion years), such a star will eventually burn all its hydrogen, for a while becoming a blue dwarf, and end its evolution as a helium white dwarf composed chiefly of helium-4 nuclei. Due to the very long time this process takes, it is not thought to be the origin of the observed helium white dwarfs. Rather, they are believed to be mostly the product of mass loss in binary systems. Proposals to explain those helium white dwarfs that are not part of binary systems include mass loss due to a large exoplanetary companion, stars being stripped of material by companions exploding as supernovae, and various types of stellar mergers.

=== Stars with low to medium mass ===
If the mass of a main-sequence star is between 0.5 and 8 M_{☉}, its core will become sufficiently hot to fuse helium into carbon and oxygen via the triple-alpha process, but it will never become sufficiently hot to fuse neon. Near the end of the period in which it undergoes fusion reactions, such a star will have a carbon–oxygen or oxygen-neon core that does not undergo fusion reactions, surrounded by an inner helium-burning shell and an outer hydrogen-burning shell. On the Hertzsprung–Russell diagram, it will be found on the asymptotic giant branch. It will then expel most of its outer material to form a planetary nebula, leaving only the carbon–oxygen core.

White dwarfs with a mass greater than 1.05 M_{☉} are termed ultramassive white dwarfs. When formed in single-star systems, these are expected to have an oxygen-neon core. However, a significant fraction (~20%) of ultramassive white dwarfs are formed through white dwarf mergers. In this case the result is a carbon-oxygen ultramassive white dwarf.

=== Stars with medium to high mass ===
If a star is massive enough, its core will eventually become sufficiently hot to fuse carbon to neon, and then to fuse neon to iron. Such a star will not become a white dwarf, because the mass of its central, non-fusing core, initially supported by electron degeneracy pressure, will eventually exceed the largest possible mass supportable by degeneracy pressure. At this point the core of the star will collapse and it will explode in a core-collapse supernova that will leave behind a remnant neutron star, black hole, or possibly a more exotic form of compact star. Some main-sequence stars, of perhaps 8 to 10 M_{☉}, although sufficiently massive to fuse carbon to neon and magnesium, may be insufficiently massive to fuse neon. Such a star may leave a remnant white dwarf composed chiefly of oxygen, neon, and magnesium, provided that its core does not collapse, and provided that fusion does not proceed so violently as to blow apart the star in a supernova. Although a few white dwarfs have been identified that may be of this type, most evidence for the existence of such comes from the novae called ONeMg or neon novae. The spectra of these novae exhibit abundances of neon, magnesium, and other intermediate-mass elements that appear to be only explicable by the accretion of material onto an oxygen–neon–magnesium white dwarf.

=== Type Iax supernova ===
Type Iax supernovae, that involve helium accretion by a white dwarf, have been proposed to be a channel for transformation of this type of stellar remnant. In this scenario, the carbon detonation produced in a Type Ia supernova is too weak to destroy the white dwarf, expelling just a small part of its mass as ejecta, but produces an asymmetric explosion that kicks the star, often known as a zombie star, to the high speeds of a hypervelocity star. The matter processed in the failed detonation is re-accreted by the white dwarf with the heaviest elements such as iron falling to its core where it accumulates. These iron-core white dwarfs would be smaller than the carbon–oxygen kind of similar mass and would cool and crystallize faster than those.

== Fate ==
Artist's concept of white dwarf aging

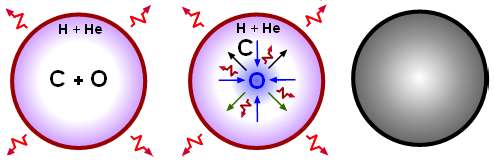
Internal structures of white dwarfs. To the left is a newly formed white dwarf, in the center is a cooling and crystallizing white dwarf, and the right is a black dwarf.

Once formed, a white dwarf is stable and will usually continue to cool almost indefinitely. The oldest known white dwarfs still radiate at temperatures of a few thousand kelvins, which establishes an observational limit on the maximum possible age of the universe. Assuming that the universe continues to expand, it is thought that in 10^{19} to 10^{20} years, the galaxies will be composed of white dwarfs, brown dwarfs, neutron stars and black holes, all slowly being dispersed as galaxies disintegrate.

The lifetime of a white dwarf is thought to be on the order of the hypothetical lifetime of the proton, known to be at least 10^{34}–10^{35} years. If protons do decay, the mass of a white dwarf will decrease very slowly with time as its nuclei decay, until it loses enough mass to become a non-degenerate lump of matter, and finally disappears completely in a total time around 10^{38} years.

A white dwarf can also be cannibalized or evaporated by a companion star, causing the white dwarf to lose so much mass that it becomes a planetary mass object. The resultant object, orbiting the former companion, now host star, could be a helium planet or diamond planet.

== Debris disks and planets ==
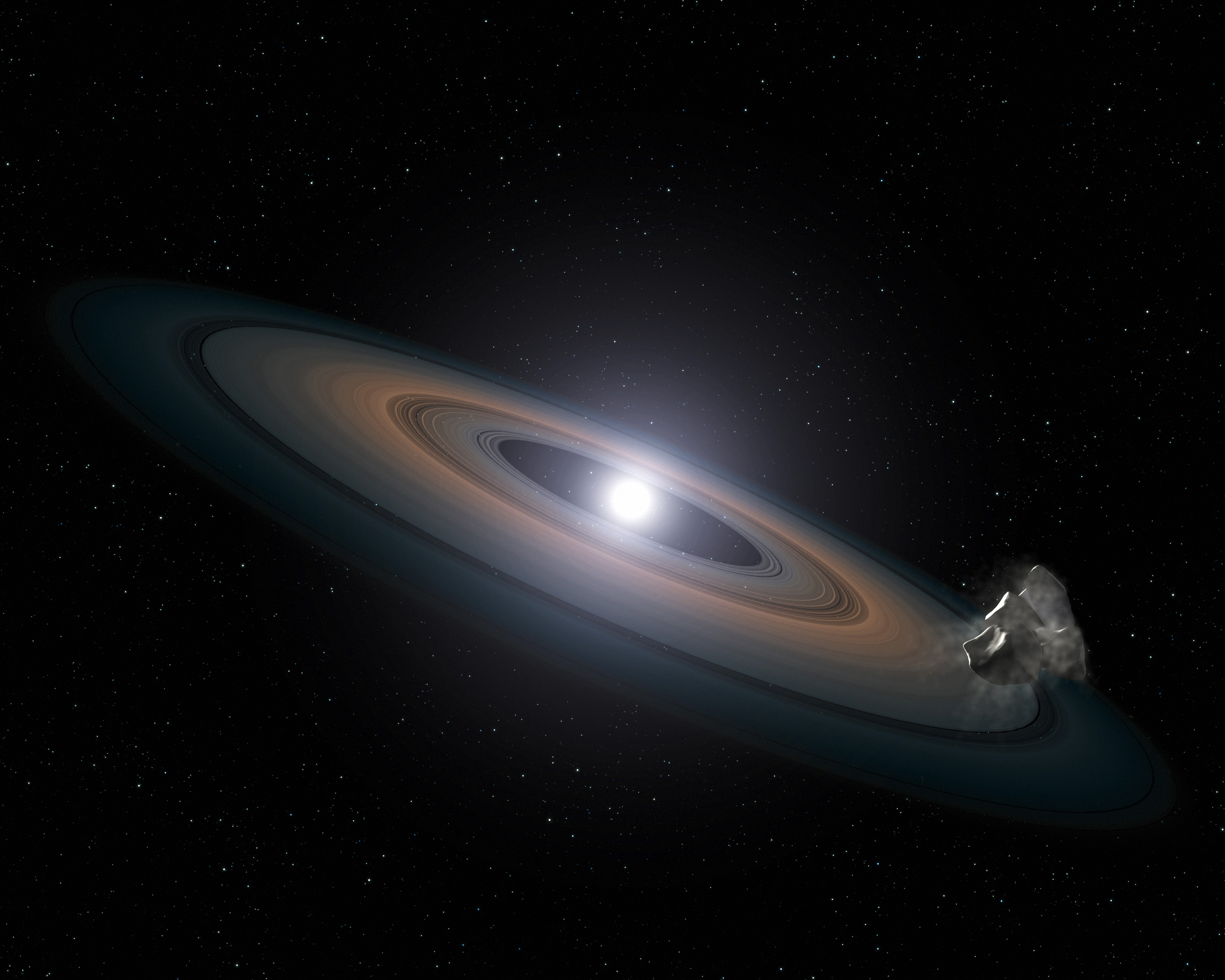
Artist's impression of debris around a white dwarf

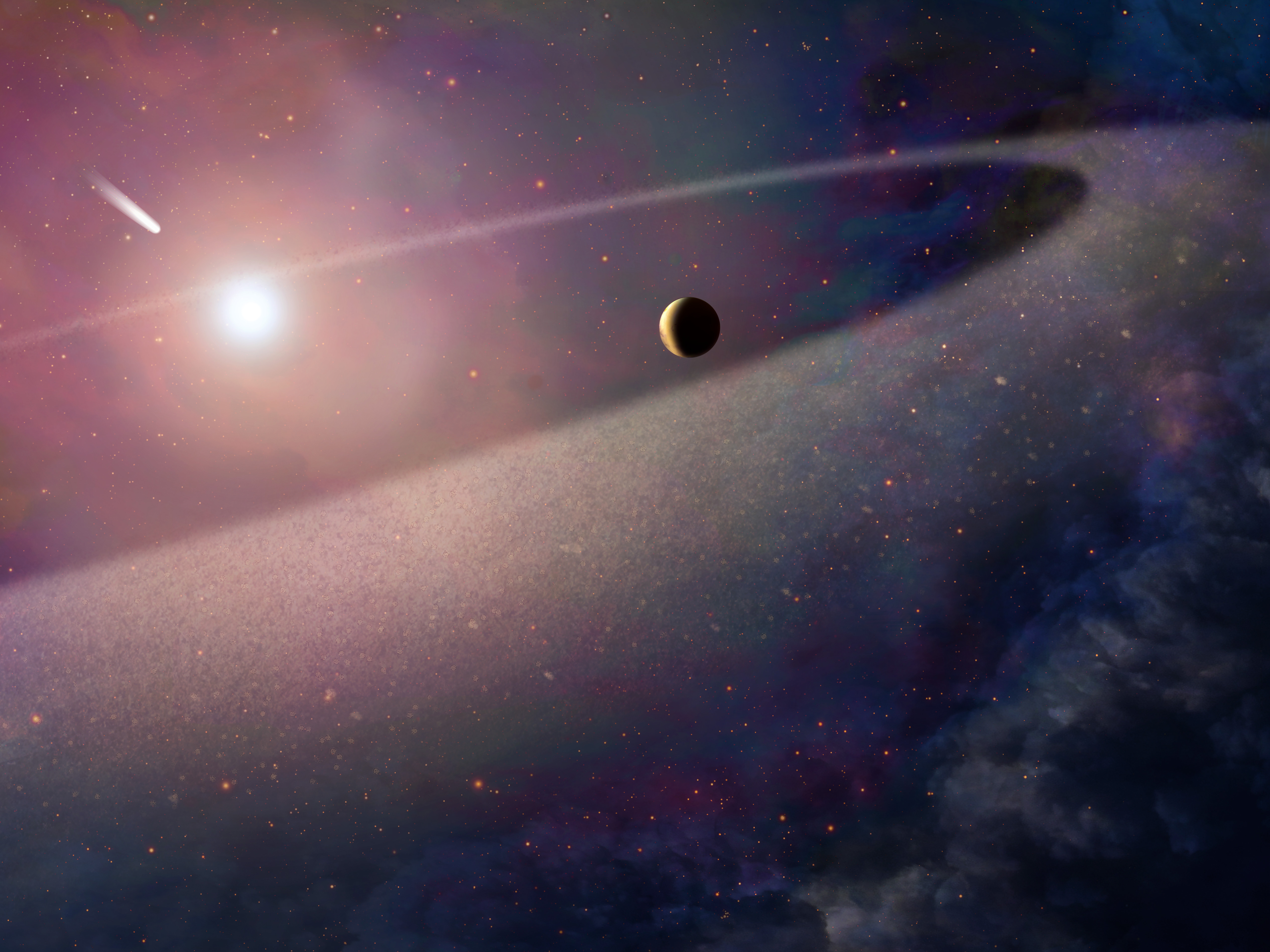
Comet falling into white dwarf (artist's impression)

A white dwarf's stellar and planetary system is inherited from its progenitor star and may interact with the white dwarf in various ways. There are several indications that a white dwarf has a remnant planetary system.

The most common observable evidence of a remnant planetary system is pollution of the spectrum of a white dwarf with metal absorption lines. 27–50% of white dwarfs show a spectrum polluted with metals, but these heavy elements settle out in the atmosphere of white dwarfs colder than 20000 K. The most widely accepted hypothesis is that this pollution comes from tidally disrupted rocky bodies. The first observation of a metal-polluted white dwarf was by van Maanen in 1917 at the Mount Wilson Observatory and is now recognized as the first evidence of exoplanets in astronomy. The white dwarf van Maanen 2 shows iron, calcium and magnesium in its atmosphere, but van Maanen misclassified it as the faintest F-type star based on the calcium H- and K-lines. The nitrogen in white dwarfs is thought to come from nitrogen-ice of extrasolar Kuiper Belt objects, the lithium is thought to come from accreted crust material and the beryllium is thought to come from exomoons.

A less common observable evidence is infrared excess due to a flat and optically thick debris disk, which is found in around 1%–4% of white dwarfs. The first white dwarf with infrared excess was discovered by Zuckerman and Becklin in 1987 in the near-infrared around Giclas 29-38 and later confirmed as a debris disk. White dwarfs hotter than 27000 K sublimate all the dust formed by tidally disrupting a rocky body, preventing the formation of a debris disk. In colder white dwarfs, a rocky body might be tidally disrupted near the Roche radius and forced into a circular orbit by the Poynting–Robertson drag, which is stronger for less massive white dwarfs. The Poynting–Robertson drag will also cause the dust to orbit closer and closer towards the white dwarf, until it will eventually sublimate and the disk will disappear. A debris disk will have a lifetime of around a few million years for white dwarfs hotter than 10000 K. Colder white dwarfs can have disk-lifetimes of a few 10 million years, which is enough time to tidally disrupt a second rocky body and forming a second disk around a white dwarf, such as the two rings around LSPM J0207+3331.

The least common observable evidence of planetary systems are detected major or minor planets. Only a handful of giant planets and a handful of minor planets are known around white dwarfs.

Exoplanet orbits WD 1856+534
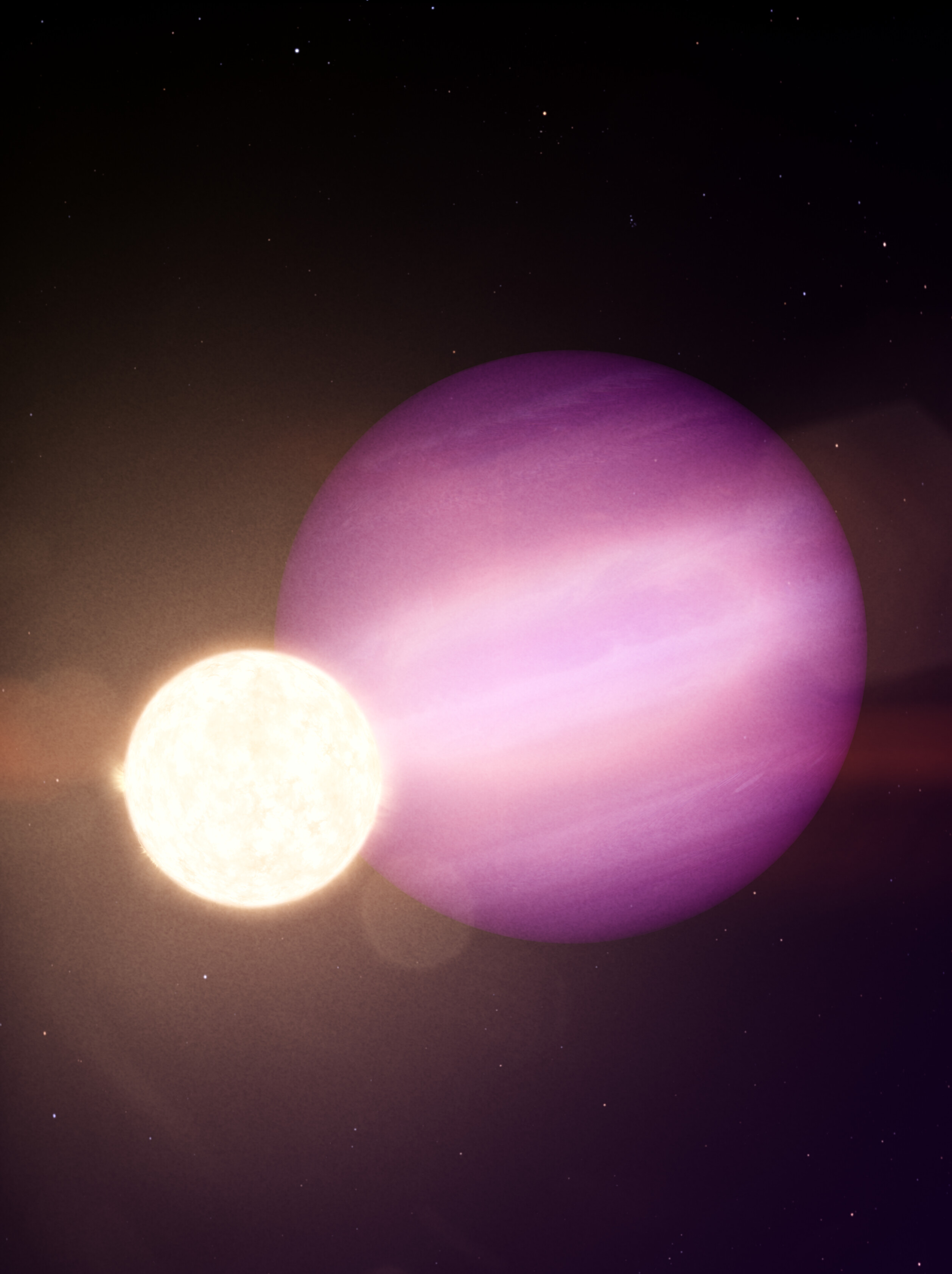

(NASA; video; 2:10)

Some estimations based on the metal content of the atmospheres of the white dwarfs consider that at least 15% of them may be orbited by planets or asteroids, or at least their debris. Another suggested idea is that white dwarfs could be orbited by the stripped cores of rocky planets, that would have survived the red giant phase of their star but losing their outer layers and, given those planetary remnants would likely be made of metals, to attempt to detect them looking for the signatures of their interaction with the white dwarf's magnetic field. Other suggested ideas of how white dwarfs are polluted with dust involve the scattering of asteroids by planets or via planet-planet scattering.

Liberation of exomoons from their host planet could cause white dwarf pollution with dust. Either the liberation could cause asteroids to be scattered towards the white dwarf or the exomoon could be scattered into the Roche radius of the white dwarf. The mechanism behind the pollution of white dwarfs in binaries was also explored as these systems are more likely to lack a major planet, but this idea cannot explain the presence of dust around single white dwarfs. While old white dwarfs show evidence of dust accretion, white dwarfs older than ~1 billion years or >7000 K with dusty infrared excess were not detected until the discovery of LSPM J0207+3331 in 2018, which has a cooling age of ~3 billion years. The white dwarf shows two dusty components that are being explained with two rings with different temperatures.

Another possible way to detect planetary systems around white dwarfs is through their radio emissions. In 2004 and 2005, A. J. Willes and K. Wu hypothesized that when an exoplanet travels through the magnetosphere of a white dwarf, it may generate auroral radio emissions from the magnetic poles of the white dwarf, similar to how Io stimulates radio emissions from Jupiter; a search for such radio emission from nine white dwarfs by researchers using the Arecibo radio telescope did not find any so far.

=== Examples ===
Infrared spectroscopic observations made by NASA's Spitzer Space Telescope of WD 2226-210, the central star of the Helix Nebula, suggest the presence of a dust cloud, which may be caused by cometary collisions. It is possible that infalling material from this may cause X-ray emission from the central star. Similarly, observations made in 2004 indicated the presence of a dust cloud around the young (estimated to have formed from its AGB progenitor about 500 million years ago) white dwarf G29-38, which may have been created by tidal disruption of a comet passing close to the white dwarf.

The metal-rich white dwarf WD 1145+017 is the first white dwarf observed with a disintegrating minor planet that transits the star. The disintegration of the planetesimal generates a debris cloud that passes in front of the star every 4.5 hours, causing a 5-minute-long fade in the star's optical brightness. The depth of the transit is highly variable.

Optical spectra from the hot white dwarf WD J0914+1914 provides evidence of a circumstellar disc accreting on to the star with material consistent with deeper atmospheric components of giant icy planets.

The white dwarf WD 0145+234 shows brightening in the mid-infrared, seen in NEOWISE data. The brightening, not seen before 2018, may be due to the tidal disruption of an exoasteroid, the first time such an event has been observed.

The white dwarf WD 1856+534 dims every 1.4 days, providing evidence of a planet with a mass between 1 and 14 times that of Jupiter. The orbital period and lower mass estimate make it unlikely that this a result of common envelope evolution, but rather a planet scattered by gravity in a tight orbit without complete tidal disruption. Model studies suggest this observation means smaller exoplanets orbiting white drawfs may be rare.

MOA-2010-BLG-477L, a white dwarf first discovered form a microlensing event, has been studied by multiple techniques and is believed to have a super-Jupiter planet.

GD 140 and LAWD 37 are suspected to have giant exoplanets due to anomaly in the Hipparcos-Gaia proper motion. For GD 140 it is suspected to be a planet several times more massive than Jupiter and for LAWD 37 it is suspected to be a planet less massive than Jupiter. Additionally, WD 0141-675 was suspected to have a super-Jupiter with an orbital period of 33.65 days based on Gaia astrometry. This is remarkable because WD 0141-675 is polluted with metals and metal polluted white dwarfs have long been suspected to host giant planets that disturb the orbits of minor planets, causing the pollution. Both GD 140 and WD 0141 will be observed with JWST in cycle 2 with the aim to detect infrared excess caused by the planets. The planet candidate at WD 0141-675 was found to be a false positive caused by a software error.

== Habitability ==
A search has been proposed for transits of hypothetical Earth-like planets around white dwarfs with surface temperatures of less than 10000 K. Such stars could harbor a habitable zone at a distance of c. 0.005 to 0.02 AU that would last upwards of 3 billion years. This is so close that any habitable planets would be tidally locked. As a white dwarf has a size similar to that of a planet, these kinds of transits would produce strong eclipses.

Newer research casts some doubts on this idea, given that the close orbits of those hypothetical planets around their parent stars would subject them to strong tidal forces that could render them uninhabitable by triggering a greenhouse effect. Another suggested constraint to this idea is the origin of those planets. Leaving aside formation from the accretion disk surrounding the white dwarf, there are two ways a planet could end in a close orbit around stars of this kind: by surviving being engulfed by the star during its red giant phase, and then spiralling inward, or inward migration after the white dwarf has formed. The former case is implausible for low-mass bodies, as they are unlikely to survive being absorbed by their stars. In the latter case, the planets would have to expel so much orbital energy as heat, through tidal interactions with the white dwarf, that they would likely end as uninhabitable embers.

== Binary stars and novae ==
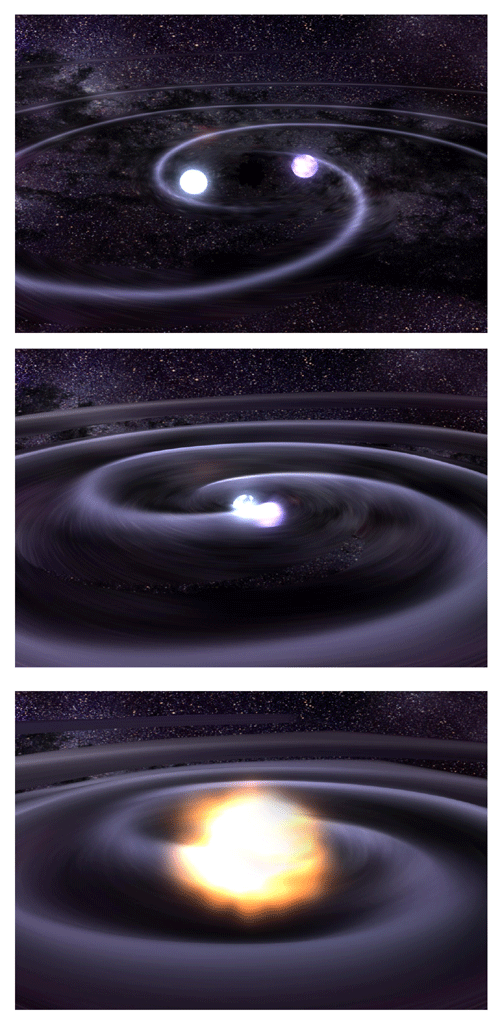
The merger process of two co-orbiting white dwarfs produces gravitational waves

If a white dwarf is in a binary star system and is accreting matter from its companion, a variety of phenomena may occur, including novae and Type Ia supernovae. It may also be a super-soft x-ray source if it is able to take material from its companion fast enough to sustain fusion on its surface. On the other hand, phenomena in binary systems such as tidal interaction and star–disc interaction, moderated by magnetic fields or not, act on the rotation of accreting white dwarfs. In fact, the (securely known) fastest-spinning white dwarfs are members of binary systems (the fastest one being the white dwarf in CTCV J2056-3014). A close binary system of two white dwarfs can lose angular momentum and radiate energy in the form of gravitational waves, causing their mutual orbit to steadily shrink until the stars merge.

=== Type Ia supernovae ===
The mass of an isolated, nonrotating white dwarf cannot exceed the Chandrasekhar limit of ~ 1.4 M_{☉}. This limit may increase if the white dwarf is rotating rapidly and nonuniformly. White dwarfs in binary systems can accrete material from a companion star, increasing both their mass and their density. As their mass approaches the Chandrasekhar limit, this could theoretically lead to either the explosive ignition of fusion in the white dwarf or its collapse into a neutron star.

There are two models that might explain the progenitor systems of Type Ia supernovae: the single-degenerate model and the double-degenerate model. In the single-degenerate model, a carbon–oxygen white dwarf accretes mass and compresses its core by pulling mass from a companion non-degenerate star. It is believed that compressional heating of the core leads to ignition of carbon fusion as the mass approaches the Chandrasekhar limit. Because the white dwarf is supported against gravity by quantum degeneracy pressure instead of by thermal pressure, adding heat to the star's interior increases its temperature but not its pressure, so the white dwarf does not expand and cool in response. Rather, the increased temperature accelerates the rate of the fusion reaction, in a runaway process that feeds on itself. The thermonuclear flame consumes much of the white dwarf in a few seconds, causing a Type Ia supernova explosion that obliterates the star. In another possible mechanism for Type Ia supernovae, the double-degenerate model, two carbon–oxygen white dwarfs in a binary system merge, creating an object with mass greater than the Chandrasekhar limit in which carbon fusion is then ignited. In both cases, the white dwarfs are not expected to survive the Type Ia supernova.

The single-degenerate model was the favored mechanism for Type Ia supernovae, but now, because of observations, the double-degenerate model is thought to be the more likely scenario. Predicted rates of white dwarf-white dwarf mergers are comparable to the rate of Type Ia supernovae and would explain the lack of hydrogen in the spectra of Type Ia supernovae. The main mechanism for Type Ia supernovae remains an open question. In the single-degenerate scenario, the accretion rate onto the white dwarf needs to be within a narrow range dependent on its mass so that the hydrogen burning on the surface of the white dwarf is stable. If the accretion rate is too low, novae on the surface of the white dwarf will blow away accreted material. If it is too high, the white dwarf will expand and the white dwarf and companion star will be in a common envelope. This stops the growth of the white dwarf thus preventing it from reaching the Chandrasekhar limit and exploding. For the single-degenerate model its companion is expected to survive, but there is no strong evidence of such a star near Type Ia supernovae sites. In the double-degenerate scenario, white dwarfs need to be in very close binaries; otherwise their inspiral time is longer than the age of the universe. It is also likely that instead of a Type Ia supernova, the merger of two white dwarfs will lead to core-collapse. As a white dwarf accretes material quickly, the core can ignite off-center, which leads to gravitational instabilities that could create a neutron star.

The historical bright SN 1006 is thought to have been a Type Ia supernova from a white dwarf, possibly the merger of two white dwarfs. Tycho's Supernova of 1572 was also a type Ia supernova, and its remnant has been detected. WD 0810–353, a white dwarf 11 parsecs away from the Sun, is possibly a hypervelocity runaway ejected from a Type Ia supernova, though this has been disputed.

=== Post-common envelope binary ===
A post-common envelope binary (PCEB) is a binary consisting of a white dwarf or hot subdwarf and a closely tidally-locked red dwarf (in other cases this might be a brown dwarf instead of a red dwarf). These binaries form when the red dwarf is engulfed in the red giant phase. As the red dwarf orbits inside the common envelope, it is slowed down in the denser environment. This slowed orbital speed is compensated with a decrease of the orbital distance between the red dwarf and the core of the red giant. The red dwarf spirals inwards towards the core and might merge with the core. If this does not happen and instead the common envelope is ejected, then the binary ends up in a close orbit, consisting of a white dwarf and a red dwarf. This type of binary is called a post-common envelope binary. The evolution of the PCEB continues as the two dwarf stars orbit closer and closer due to magnetic braking and by releasing gravitational waves. The binary might then evolve into one of several dramatic outcomes: a high-field magnetic white dwarf, a white dwarf pulsar, a double-degenerate binary, or even a Type Ia supernova. Because a PCEB may evolve at some point into a cataclysmic variable, some of them are also called pre-cataclysmic variables.

=== Cataclysmic variables ===
Before accretion of material pushes a white dwarf close to the Chandrasekhar limit, accreted hydrogen-rich material on the surface may ignite in a less destructive type of thermonuclear explosion powered by hydrogen fusion. These surface explosions can be repeated as long as the white dwarf's core remains intact. This weaker kind of repetitive cataclysmic phenomenon is called a (classical) nova. Astronomers have also observed dwarf novae, which have smaller, more frequent luminosity peaks than the classical novae. These are thought to be caused by the release of gravitational potential energy when part of the accretion disc collapses onto the star, rather than through a release of energy due to fusion. In general, binary systems with a white dwarf accreting matter from a stellar companion are called cataclysmic variables. As well as novae and dwarf novae, several other classes of these variables are known, including polars and intermediate polars, both of which feature highly magnetic white dwarfs. Both fusion- and accretion-powered cataclysmic variables have been observed to be X-ray sources.

=== Other multiple-star systems ===
Other binaries include those that consist of a main sequence star (or giant) and a white dwarf. The binary Sirius AB is an example pair of this type. White dwarfs can also exist as binaries or multiple star systems that only consist of white dwarfs. An example of a resolved triple white dwarf system is WD J1953−1019, discovered with Gaia DR2 data. One interesting field is the study of remnant planetary systems around white dwarfs. It is expected that planets orbiting several AU from a star will survive the star's post-main-sequence transformation into a white dwarf. Moreover, white dwarfs, being much smaller and correspondingly less luminous than their progenitors, are less likely to outshine any bodies in orbit around them. This makes white dwarfs advantageous targets for direct-imaging searches for exoplanets and brown dwarfs. The first brown dwarf to be detected by direct imaging was the companion to the white dwarf GD 165 A, discovered in 1988. More recently, the white dwarf WD 0806−661 was found to have a cold companion body of substellar mass, variously described as a brown dwarf or an exoplanet.

== Nearest white dwarfs ==
White dwarfs within 25 light years
Identifier	WD Number	Distance [ly]	Type	Absolute magnitude	Mass [M_{☉}]	Luminosity [L_{☉}]	Age [Gyr]	Objects in system
Sirius B	0642–166	8.66	DA	11.18	0.98	0.0295	0.10	2
Procyon B	0736+053	11.46	DQZ	13.20	0.63	0.00049	1.37	2
Van Maanen 2	0046+051	14.07	DZ	14.09	0.68	0.00017	3.30	1
LP 145-141	1142–645	15.12	DQ	12.77	0.61	0.00054	1.29	1
40 Eridani B	0413–077	16.39	DA	11.27	0.59	0.0141	0.12	3
Stein 2051 B	0426+588	17.99	DC	13.43	0.69	0.00030	2.02	2
G 240-72	1748+708	20.26	DQ	15.23	0.81	0.000085	5.69	1
Gliese 223.2	0552–041	21.01	DZ	15.29	0.82	0.000062	7.89	1
Gliese 3991 B	1708+437	24.23	D??	> 15	0.5	< 0.000086	> 6	2

== See also ==
- Extreme helium star – Low-mass supergiant that is almost devoid of hydrogen
- List of white dwarfs
- PG 1159 star – Transitional stellar stage before becoming a white dwarf
- Robust associations of massive baryonic objects – Proposed type of star cluster
- Timeline of white dwarfs, neutron stars, and supernovae – Chronological list of developments in knowledge and records
