= List of planet types =

Types of planet by chemical mass

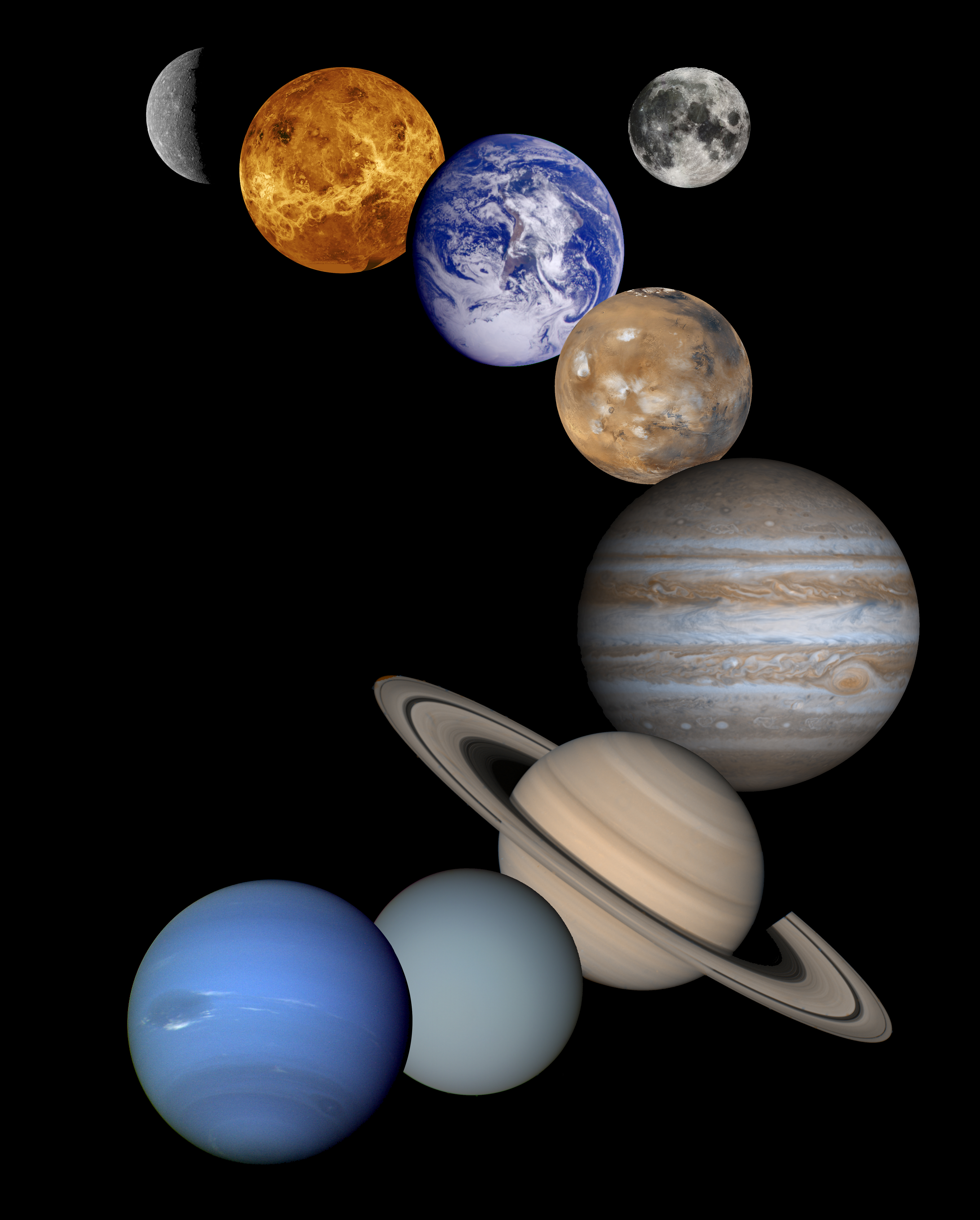
From top to bottom: Mercury, Venus without its atmosphere, Earth and the Moon, Mars, Jupiter, Saturn, Uranus, and Neptune in false colour (not to scale)

The following is a list of planet types by their mass, radius, orbit, physical and chemical composition, or by another classification.

== By mass and/or radius regime ==
Planet type	Description	Example(s)
Super-Jupiter	A planet more massive than Jupiter.	Kappa Andromedae b, Epsilon Indi Ab
Giant planet	A massive planet similar to Jupiter or Saturn. They are most commonly composed primarily of 'gases' (Hydrogen and Helium) or 'ice' (volatiles such as water, methane, and ammonia), but may also be composed primarily of 'rock', which would make one a Mega Earth. Regardless of their bulk compositions, giant planets normally have thick atmospheres of hydrogen and helium.	Jupiter, Saturn
Super-Neptune	A planet with mass between that of Neptune and Saturn.	PH1b, K2-33b
Sub-Neptune	A planet smaller than Neptune, but larger than the small planet radius gap.	Kepler-22b, Enaiposha
Mega-Earth	A massive terrestrial planet that is at least ten times the mass of Earth.	TOI-849 b
Super-Earth	A planet larger than Earth, but smaller than the small planet radius gap. Generally believed to be terrestrial planets.	Kepler-10b, Gliese 667 Cc
Sub-Earth	A classification of planets "substantially less massive" than Earth and Venus.	Mercury, Kepler-37b, Barnard's Star b

== By orbital regime ==
Planet type	Description	Examples
Circumbinary planet	An exoplanet that orbits two stars.	PH1b, Kepler-16b
Circumtriple planet	An exoplanet that orbits three stars.	Gliese 900 b
Double planet	Also known as a binary planet. Two planetary-mass objects orbiting each other.	Pluto–Charon, 2MASS J1119–1137 AB
Eccentric Jupiter	A gas giant that orbits its star in an eccentric orbit.	HD 80606 b, HD 20782 b
Cold Jupiter	A Jupiter-like exoplanet with a semi-major axis over 1 AU.	Jupiter, Saturn, Gliese 777 b
Warm Jupiter	A Jupiter-like exoplanet with an orbital period between 10 and 200 days or a semi-major axis between 0.1 and 1 AU.	TOI-5542 b
Exoplanet	A planet that does not orbit the Sun, but a different star, a stellar remnant, or a brown dwarf.	Proxima Centauri b, Dimidium
Extragalactic planet	An exoplanet outside the Milky Way.	M51-ULS-1b (unconfirmed)
Goldilocks planet	A planet with an orbit that falls within the star's habitable zone. The name derives from the fairy tale "Goldilocks and the Three Bears", in which a little girl chooses from sets of three items, ignoring the ones that are too extreme (large or small, hot or cold, etc.), and settling on the one in the middle, which is "just right".	Earth, TOI 700 d, Kepler-62f, LHS 1140 b, TRAPPIST-1f, TOI-1452 b, Kepler-1649c
Hot Jupiter	A class of extrasolar planets whose characteristics are similar to Jupiter, but that have high surface temperatures because they orbit very close—between approximately 0.015 and 0.5 AU (2.2×10^{6} and 74.8×10^{6} km)—to their parent stars, whereas Jupiter orbits its parent star (the Sun) at 5.2 AU (780×10^{6} km), causing low surface temperatures.	Dimidium, HD 209458 b, KELT-9b
Hot Neptune	An extrasolar planet in an orbit close to its star (normally less than one AU away), with a mass similar to that of Uranus or Neptune.	Awohali, Cuancoá
Inferior planet	Planets whose orbits lie within the orbit of Earth. (Note: The terms "inferior planet" and "superior planet" were originally used in the geocentric cosmology of Claudius Ptolemy to differentiate as 'inferior' those planets (Mercury and Venus) whose epicycle remained collinear with Earth and the Sun, compared to the 'superior' planets (Mars, Jupiter, and Saturn) that did not.)	Mercury and Venus
Inner planet	A planet in the Solar System that have orbits smaller than the asteroid belt. (Note: The four inner or terrestrial planets have dense, rocky compositions, few or no moons, and no ring systems. They are composed largely of refractory minerals, such as the silicates, which form their crusts and mantles, and metals, such as iron and nickel, which form their cores. Three of the four inner planets (Venus, Earth and Mars) have atmospheres substantial enough to generate weather; all have impact craters and tectonic surface features, such as rift valleys and volcanoes. The term inner planet should not be confused with inferior planet, which designates those planets that are closer to the Sun than Earth is (i.e. Mercury and Venus).)	Mercury, Venus, Earth, Mars
Outer planet	A planet in the Solar System beyond the asteroid belt, and hence refers to the gas giants.	Jupiter, Saturn, Uranus and Neptune
Pulsar planet	A planet that orbits a pulsar or a rapidly rotating neutron star.	Draugr, Poltergeist and Phobetor
Rogue planet	Also known as an interstellar planet, Rogue planets are planetary-mass objects that are not bound to any star, stellar remnant or brown dwarf.	OGLE-2016-BLG-1928
Superior planet	Planets whose orbits lie outside the orbit of Earth.	Mars, Jupiter, Saturn, Uranus and Neptune
Trojan planet	A planet co-orbiting with another planet. The discovery of a pair of co-orbital exoplanets has been reported, but later retracted. One possibility for the habitable zone is a trojan planet of a gas giant close to its star.	GJ 3470 c (unconfirmed)

== By composition ==
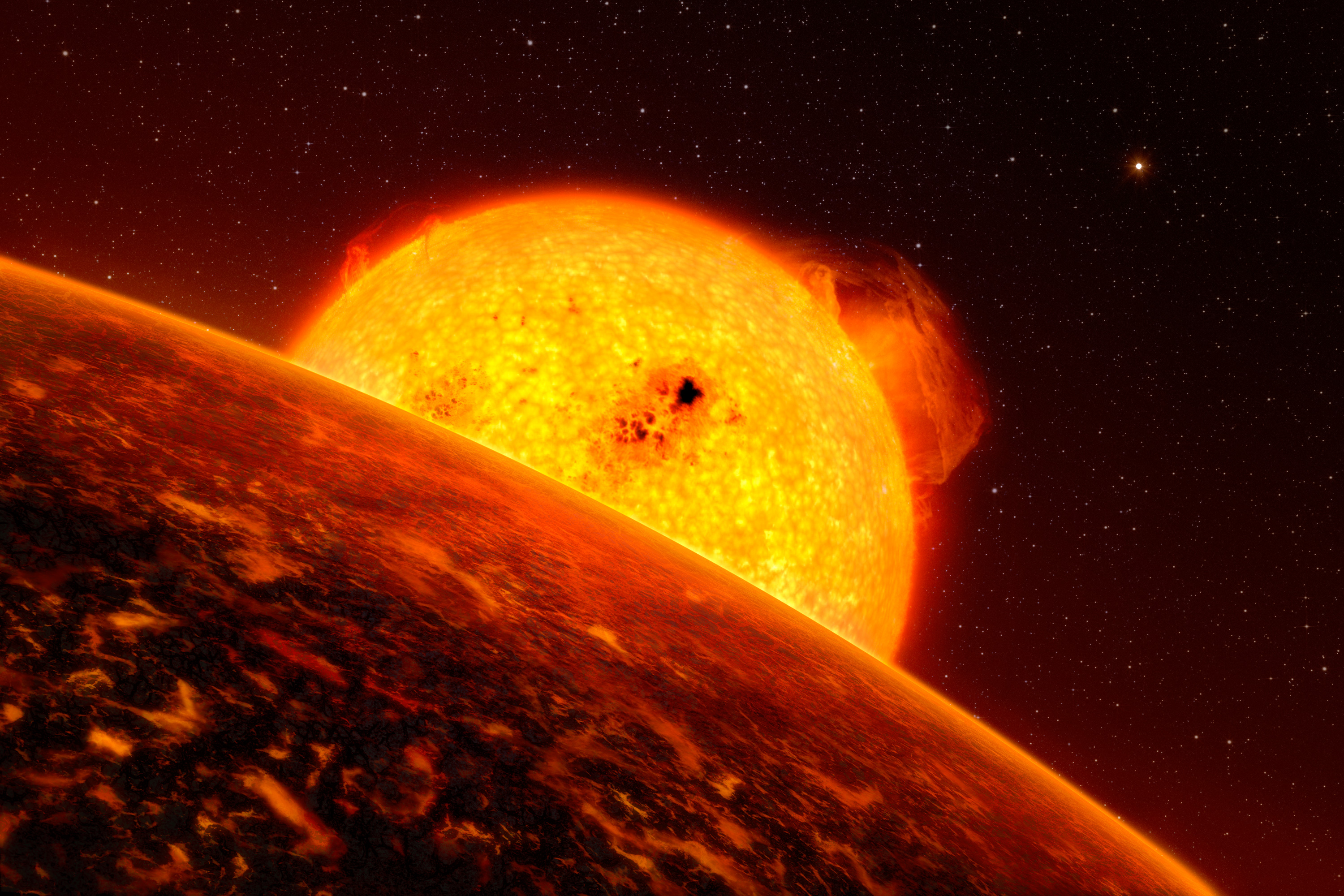
Artist's impression of CoRoT-7 Ab (in foreground), likely a lava exoplanet

Planet type	Description	Example
Chthonian planet	An extrasolar planet that orbits close to its parent star. Most Chthonian planets are expected to be gas giants that had their atmospheres stripped away, leaving their metallic rocky cores.	TOI-849b (candidate)
Carbon planet	A theoretical terrestrial planet that could form if protoplanetary discs are carbon-rich and oxygen-poor.	Draugr, Poltergeist and Phobetor (candidates)
Coreless planet	A theoretical planet that has undergone planetary differentiation but has no metallic core. Not to be confused with the Hollow Earth concept.	Ceres (candidate)
Gas dwarf	A planet with a rocky interior and a hydrogen-helium atmosphere, without significant amounts of water.	TOI-270 d
Gas giant	A massive planet composed primarily of hydrogen and helium.	Saturn, Jupiter, 70 Virginis b
Helium planet	A theoretical planet that may form via mass loss from a low-mass white dwarf. Helium planets are predicted to have roughly the same diameter as hydrogen–helium planets of the same mass.	
Hycean planet	A hypothetical type of habitable planet described as having surface liquid water ocean and a hydrogen-rich atmosphere.	K2-18 b (candidate, disputed)
Ice giant	A giant planet composed mainly of 'ice'—volatile substances heavier than hydrogen and helium, such as water, methane, and ammonia—as opposed to 'gas' (hydrogen and helium).	Neptune, Uranus, Awohali, Phailinsiam
Ice planet	A planet with a solid, icy surface consisting of ice.	OGLE-2005-BLG-390Lb, Pluto, Eris, Ganymede, Titan, Callisto
Iron planet	A planet that consists primarily of an iron-rich core with little or no mantle, such as Mercury.	Tahay
Lava planet	A terrestrial planet with a surface mostly or entirely covered by lava.	Kepler-10b, TOI-561 b
Ocean planet	A planet which contains substantial amounts of liquid water in form of oceans.	Earth, Europa, LHS 1140 b
Puffy planet	A gas giant with a large radius and very low density which is similar to or lower than Saturn's.	TrES-4
Soot planet	A proposed variant of low-density small planets which accreted significant amount of "soot": refractory organic materials rich in carbon, hydrogen, oxygen, and nitrogen.	
Steam world	A planet with an atmosphere made of steam H_{2}O	GJ 9827 d
Super-puff	A type of exoplanet with a mass only a few times larger than Earth's but with a radius larger than that of Neptune, giving it a very low mean density.	Kepler-51b, c and d
Silicate planet	A terrestrial planet that is composed primarily of silicate rocks. All four inner planets in the Solar System are silicon-based.	Mercury, Venus, Earth and Mars
Terrestrial planet	Also known as a telluric planet or rocky planet. A planet that is composed primarily of carbonaceous or silicate rocks or metals.	Solar System inner planets, TRAPPIST-1b, Kepler-37b

== By surface conditions ==
Planet type	Description	Example
Desert planet	A terrestrial planet with an arid surface consistency similar to Earth's deserts.	Mars
Eyeball planet	A terrestrial planet in which tidal locking induces a spatially dependent temperature gradient (the planet will be hotter on the side facing the star and colder on the other side); this temperature gradient limit the places in which liquids may exist on the surface of the planet to ring- or disk-shaped areas.	

== Other types ==
Planet type	Description	Example
Catastrophically evaporating planet	A type of rocky exoplanet that is in the final stage of its existence as it evaporates away due to its high temperature due to its extreme proximity to its star and because of its low-mass.	BD+05 4868Ab
Classical planets	The planets as known during classical antiquity: the Moon, the Sun, Mercury, Venus, Mars, Jupiter, and Saturn.	
Earth analog	A habitable or superhabitable planet with conditions to be compared with those found on Earth.	
Jupiter analogue	A planet whose physical and orbital characteristics are comparable to those of Jupiter.	HIP 11915 b, Ægir, Gliese 832 b
Hypothetical planet	A planet or similar body whose existence is not proven, but is believed by some to exist.	Planet Nine, FU Orionis Ab
Protoplanet	A large planetary embryo that originates within protoplanetary discs and has undergone internal melting to produce differentiated interiors. Protoplanets are believed to form out of kilometer-sized planetesimals that attract each other gravitationally and collide.	PDS 70 b and c, AB Aurigae b

== See also ==
- Hypothetical astronomical object § Hypothetical planet types
- Dwarf planet
- Minor planet
- Planets in science fiction § Planet types
- Stellar classification
- Substellar object
- Sudarsky's gas giant classification
