= Exoplanet interiors =

Exoplanet internal structure

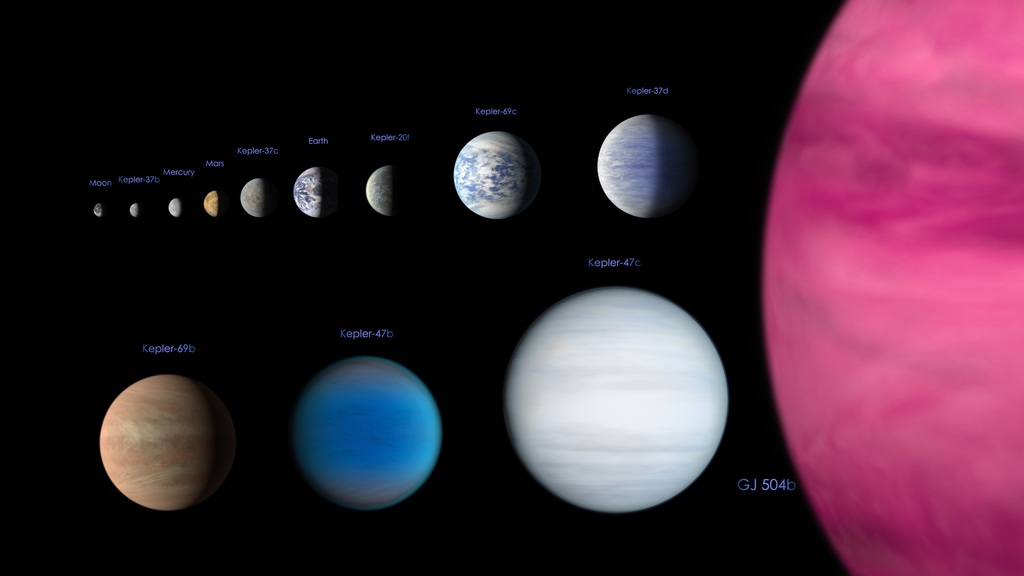
An artist rendering that compares the sizes of a few known exoplanets with the Moon, Mercury, Mars, and Earth, illustrating the diversity in observed exoplanets.

Over the years, our ability to detect, confirm, and characterize exoplanets and their atmospheres has improved, allowing researchers to begin constraining exoplanet interior composition and structure. While most exoplanet science is focused on exoplanetary atmospheric environments, the mass and radius of a planet can tell us about a planet's density, and hence, its internal processes. The internal processes of a planet are partly responsible for its atmosphere, and so they are also a determining factor in a planet's capacity to support life.

As there are over 5,600 different exoplanets and more being discovered every year, it is difficult to group them by interior type. However, NASA has broadly classified them based on their interior and exterior as a gas giant, super earth, Neptune-like, or terrestrial. Within each of these groups are several sub classifications ("hot Jupiter's", "mini-Neptune's", etc.) with many theoretical exoplanet interiors being hypothesized ("chthonian planets", "water worlds", planets with tiny cores or massive mantles, etc.); however, there is no standardized classification of exoplanet interiors.

== Methods ==
Because humans cannot travel to exoplanets and take direct measurements, scientists must use other methods to constrain their interior composition. Measuring a planet's mass and radius - characteristics that can be observed - can give clues to its internal structure. We can infer these characteristics from both the transit method and radial velocity method. As a planet transits in front of its star, the planet's radius can be determined from the reduction in light from the star. Similarly, because the planet's pull on the star causes the star to orbit around the barycenter which is not in the stars centre of mass, we can use the resulting Doppler shifts of starlight to infer the mass of the planet relative to its parent star. Within the Solar System, rocky planets have a mantle and crust containing silicates, oxides, and silicate melts, and an iron-rich core. The principal elements that compose rocky planets, which are magnesium, iron, oxygen, carbon, and silicon, are assumed to be universal in the interiors of these planet types. The abundance of these elements, as well as the heating and cooling processes they undergo during planet formation, are responsible for the planet's final composition. By measuring the mass and radius of exoplanets, the mean density of the planet can be calculated. Dense planets must have a higher proportion of heavier elements such as iron, whereas lighter planets must have higher concentrations of lighter elements such as hydrogen. However, mean density does not distinguish how different components are distributed within a planet's interior; a dense planet might have its dense material packed into a small core, or distributed through its mantle.

In addition to analyzing mass-radius relationships of planets, researchers also look to the composition of a planet's host star when hypothesizing a planet's interior composition. This is because planets and their host stars originate from the same system, so they share the same material from the accretion disk. Although planets will not have the exact same composition as their host star, they would share similar fractions of certain elements. For example, in metal-poor areas of the galaxy containing metal-poor stars, researchers assume that planets also have less metal abundance compared to systems and stars that are richer in metals. The iron abundance of a system is particularly important since it is a common component in planetary interiors, along with elements such as nickel and metallic alloys. Iron is a relatively heavy element that is believed to exist universally in rocky planets. This iron can exist in the mantle in silicates and oxides if it is oxidized, but otherwise will form a terrestrial planet's core as a metal. Hence, the availability of oxygen, along with similarities in mass and radius to known rocky planets, can help indicate the possibility of a mantle with oxidized iron.

A newer method of analyzing exoplanet interiors is by looking at just their core mass, radius, and composition instead of the entire planet - such as with the James Webb Space Telescope. In mid 2024, The Webb telescope was able to measure an exoplanet's interior for the first time. This provided new insight into WASP-107b with a new methane measurement which was 1000 times lower than expected.

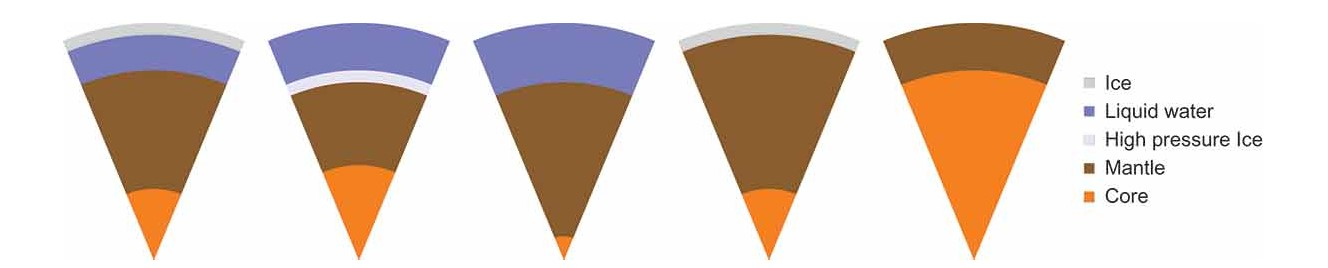
Schematic representation of five possible interior compositions of terrestrial exoplanets (not an exhaustive list of possibilities). The figure was created by Tim Van Hoolst, Lena Noack, and Attilio Rivoldini, and appears in their publication "Exoplanet interiors and habitability"

== Possible interior types ==
The Solar System has a variety of planetary interiors; Earth has an inner and outer core (reaching to approximately 55% of Earth's radius), mantle, and crust, and Venus is commonly thought to have a similar structure. Mercury has a much larger core radius that 80% of the planetary radius, as well as a mantle that is much more abundant in sulfur and much less abundant in iron relative to the other terrestrial planets. Mars has a relatively smaller core, and a mantle containing roughly twice the mass fraction of iron compared to the Earth. The cores of the outer planets Jupiter, Saturn, Uranus, and Neptune are much less understood, though it is believed Jupiter and Saturn have cores containing iron and nickel at temperatures and pressures far higher than those seen in the interiors of the inner, rocky planets. In addition, the interiors of the outer planets have much more ice and volatiles relative to the inner rocky planets.

Because the planets in the Solar System contain a diverse set of interiors, the interiors of exoplanets likely exhibit similar or even greater diversity. For example, the thickness of a planetary crust is directly proportional to how quickly the planet cooled after its formation. A fast cooling rate is expected for a smaller planet, a low-mass planet, or a planet that is further away from its star. Such planets would have a proportionally thicker crust, as is seen in the Moon and Mars.

However, there are types of planets that are not seen in the Solar System, such as low-density "hot Jupiters", which are hotter and larger than the Solar System's gas giants. Observers have also found many "super-Earths" or "mini-Neptunes", i.e. planets with a radius between that of Earth and Neptune, whose radius is 4 times that of Earth. The existence of planet types not represented in the Solar System suggests the existence of planetary interiors that are likewise not represented in the Solar System. Some proposed interior types include tiny cores, massive mantles, and an ocean surface with no continents: or, a massive core and mantle, or perhaps there can be planets with an ice layer between its mantle and surface, both above a core. Another proposed interior is a chthonian planet, a gas giant like a "hot Jupiter" that has had the outer hydrogen and helium layers stripped away leaving what looks like a rocky planet behind.

There are no confirmed examples of these proposed interior structures. However, there are hypotheses of the potential internal structures of some exoplanets. One such example is GJ 1214b, that has a mass 6.55 times greater than the Earth's and is 2.68 times the radius of Earth, but only approximately one-third Earth's density. GJ 1214b's density of1870 kg m^{−3} is too low to represent a dominantly metal and silicate rock composition, despite the large size of the planet. Three different types of interior makeup have been hypothesized for this planet. One is that the planet has an iron core, a mantle composed of silicates, and an outermost layer of water, which supports a thick envelope of hydrogen and helium. Another hypothesis keeps the iron core and silicate mantle assumption, but eliminates the water outer layer, and requires a thicker hydrogen/helium envelope. A third hypothesis proposes that the planet is mostly water, and has a large atmosphere composed mostly of steam. In 2020, TOI-849b became a candidate for being a chthonian planet as it has a small radius but disproportionately large mass.

As more exoplanets are discovered, the range of types of planets also grows, beyond planet types not seen in the Solar System. Some exoplanets may resemble the Earth in radius, but are much less dense or much denser. Other exoplanets can resemble Earth in density, but have a very different size. As such, it is difficult to classify potential planetary interiors based on their similarities to Solar System objects.

Continued exoplanet discoveries allow a statistical analysis of planet types, and the identification of distinct planetary populations of certain mass and radii. This allows an expansion of the definition of categories such as "terrestrial" planets or "gas giants" beyond that seen in the Solar System, to the range of all known exoplanets.

== Habitability ==
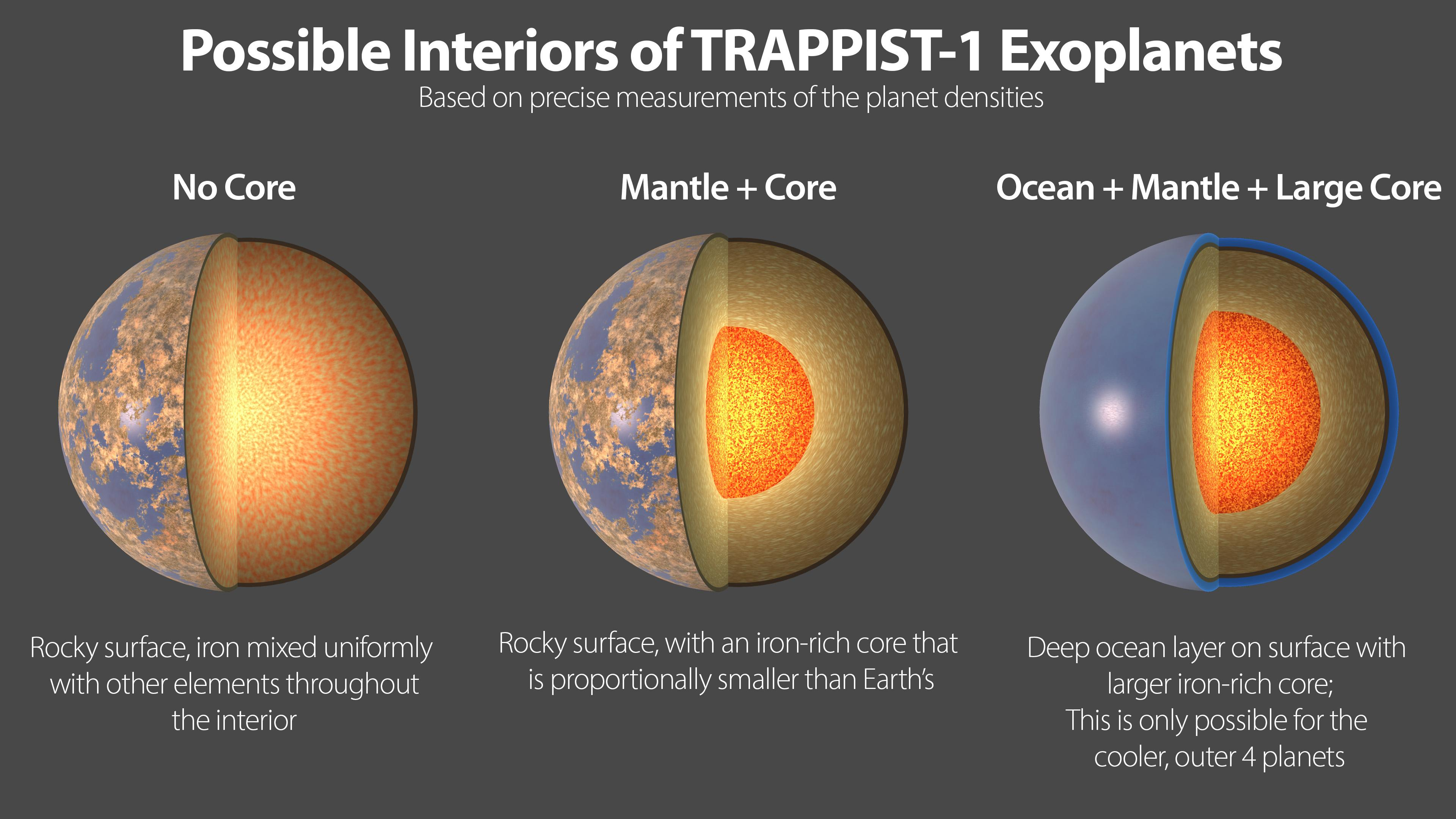
An artist rendering that of possible interiors of the TRAPPIST-1 system of rocky planets, which are targets of astrobiological interest.

The relevance of planetary-scale cycles to habitability drives much research into exoplanetary interiors. On Earth, surface and sub-surface processes such as plate tectonics, outer core convection powering the geodynamo which creates our magnetic field, and the cycling of material between the surface and interior contribute to the climate and atmospheric composition of Earth, and hence, its habitability. Because of this, the understanding of planetary interiors is becoming more popular as the study of planetary habitability grows as well. Earth is the only known planet to harbor life, so in the search for life in exoplanets, many researchers focus on searching for conditions of early or modern Earth, in particular the presence of atmospheric oxygen. Similarly, in the search for habitable planets, those that are similar to Earth (mass, radius, interior structure) are of special interest.

In addition, a planet's size and mass contribute to whether it can retain its atmosphere. Planets that are less massive have a weaker gravitational pull and are less able to retain an atmosphere. Life as we know it requires an atmosphere, so planets that have the right composition to achieve adequate planetary mass are key in determining the habitability of the planet. The presence of a magnetic field also contributes to a planet's habitability, and signatures of a possible exoplanetary magnetic field have been detected. Continued atmospheric observations that search for a magnetic field, when paired with calculations of the interior compositions of exoplanets, may provide further insight into the interior structure of an exoplanet.
