= Hypothetical astronomical object =

Astronomical bodies believed or speculated to exist

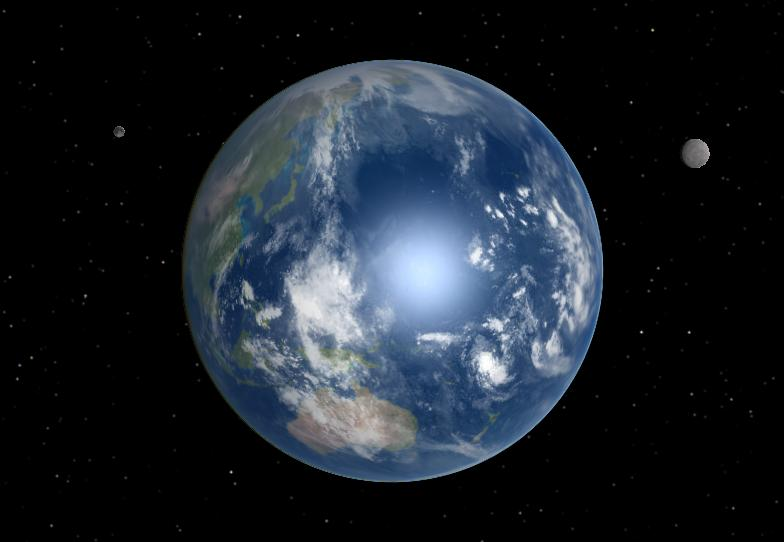
Artist's concept of Earth, orbited by a hypothetical second moon

31 Crateris, a possible eclipsing binary initially mistaken for a moon of Mercury

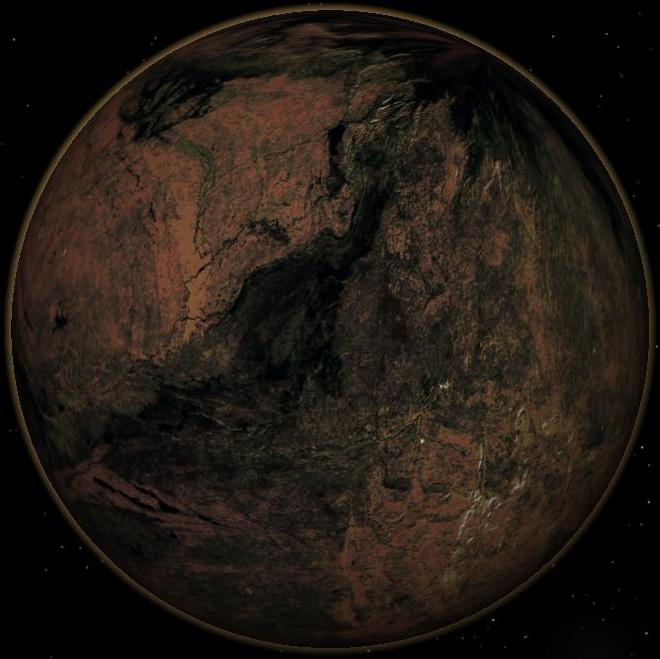
Artist's concept of a carbon planet. The surface is dark and reddish from hydrocarbon deposits.

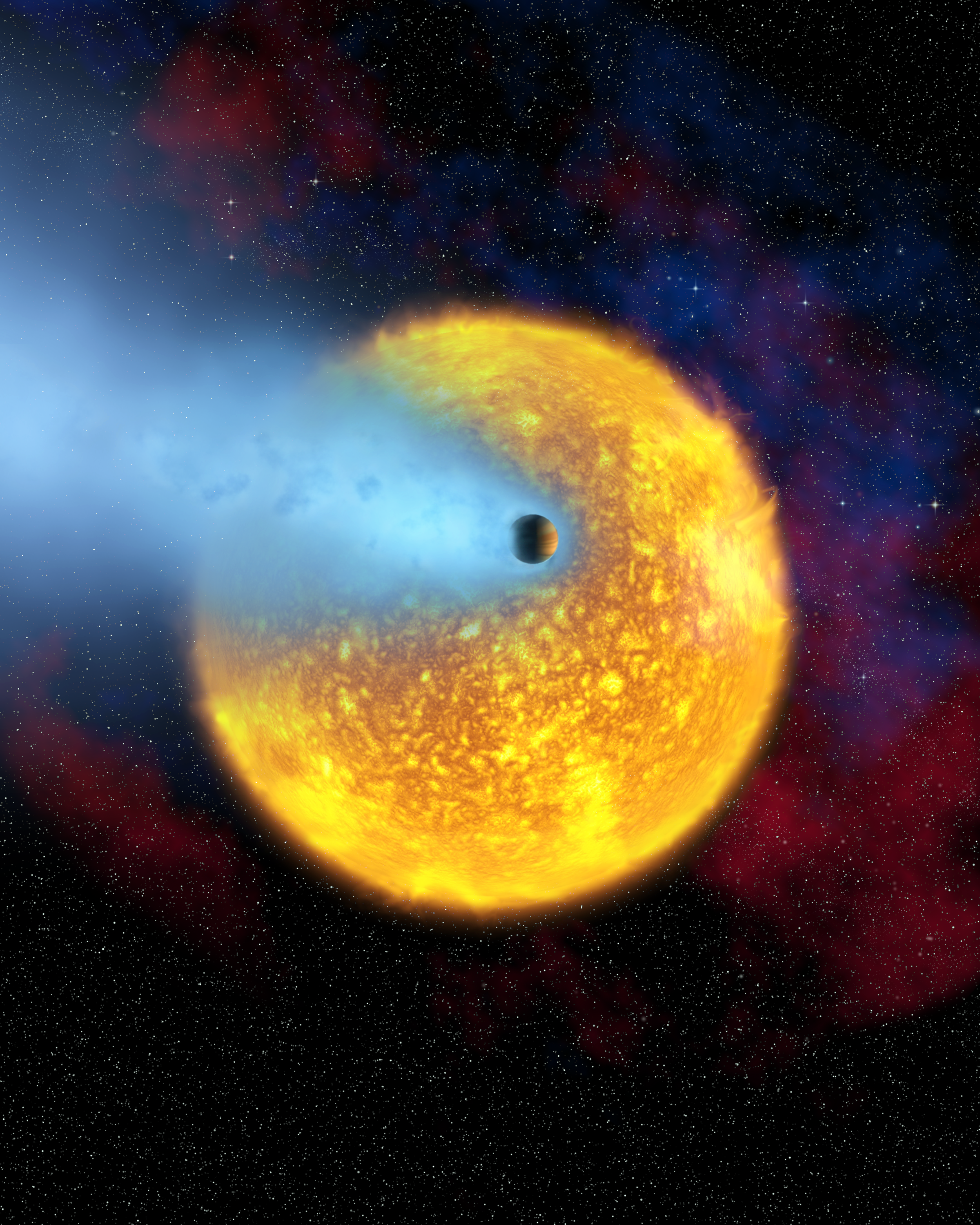
Artist's conception of HD 209458 b, a possible Chthonian planet, transiting its star

Various unknown astronomical objects have been hypothesized throughout recorded history. For example, in the 5th century BCE, the philosopher Philolaus defined a hypothetical astronomical object which he called the "Central Fire", around which he proposed other celestial bodies (including the Sun) moved.

== Types of hypothetical astronomical objects ==
Hypothetical astronomical objects have been speculated to exist both inside and outside of the Solar System, and speculation has included different kinds of stars, planets, and other astronomical objects.

- For hypothetical astronomical objects in the Solar System, see: List of hypothetical Solar System objects
- For hypothetical stars, see: Hypothetical star
- For hypothetical brown dwarfs, see: List of brown dwarfs
- For hypothetical black holes, see: Hypothetical black hole
- For extrasolar moons, all of which are currently hypothetical, see: Extrasolar moon
- For stars, planets or moons whose existence is not accepted by science, see: Planetary objects proposed in religion, astrology, ufology and pseudoscience and Stars proposed in religion
- For hypothetical planets in fiction, see: Fictional planets of the Solar System

== Hypothetical planet types ==
Hypothetical types of extrasolar planets include:

Type	Description
Ammonia planet	A planet with significant amounts of ammonia. May have lakes or oceans of ammonia.
Blanet	A planet that directly orbits a black hole.
Carbon planet	A terrestrial planet composed primarily of carbon, rather than silicon.
Chthonian planet	A hot Jupiter whose outer layers have been completely stripped off by its parent star.
Chlorine planet	A planet with significant amounts of free chlorine or hydrochloric acid.
Coreless planet	A terrestrial planet that has no metallic core.
Desert planet	A terrestrial planet with little to no water.
Extragalactic planet	A planet that is located outside the Milky Way galaxy
Eyeball planet	A tidally locked planet where uneven heating of the surface induces spatial features resembling a human eye.
Helium planet	A gas giant composed mainly of helium instead of hydrogen.
Hycean planet /ˈhaɪʃən/	A hot, water-covered planet with a hydrogen-rich atmosphere that is possibly capable of harboring extremophilic life.
Ocean planet	A planet whose surface is covered entirely by deep oceans.
Superhabitable planet	A terrestrial planet that is more habitable than Earth.
Tidally detached exomoon	A planet that was originally a moon but has become gravitationally detached.
Toroidal planet	A planet whose shape resembles a torus or doughnut.
Trojan planet	A planet that orbits near the L_{4} or L_{5} Lagrange points of a more massive object.
