= TOI-1853 b =

Supermassive Neptune-sized planet

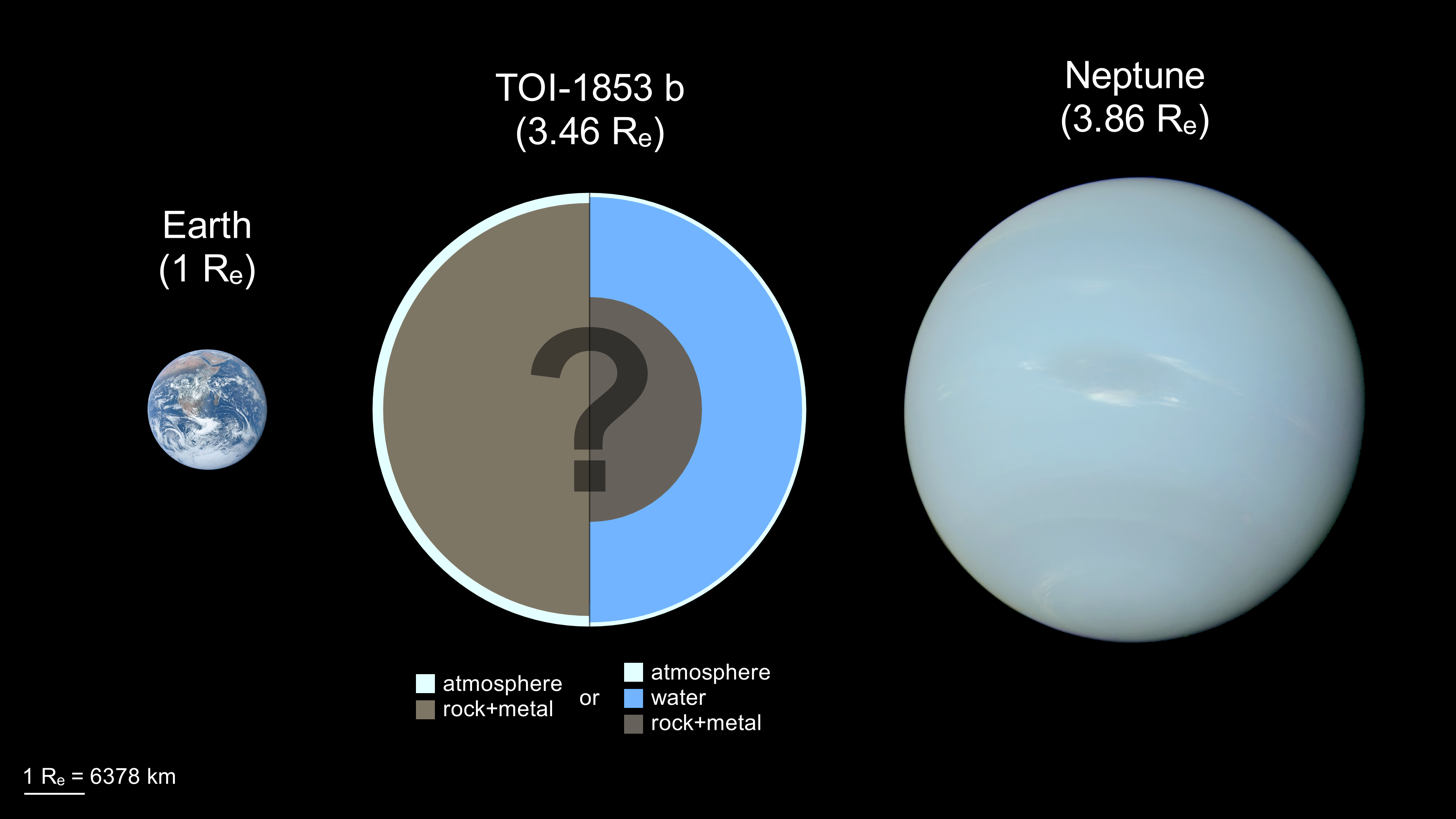
- Size comparison of TOI-1853 b with Earth and Neptune. Two hypothetical internal structures and compositions of TOI-1853 b are also shown.

Discovery
- Discovered by: TESS
- Discovery date: 2020 (first detection); 2023 (confirmation)
- Detection method: Transit

Designations
- Alternative names: TOI-1853.01

Orbital characteristics
- Epoch BJD 2459690.7420±0.0006 (mid-transit time)
- Semi-major axis: 0.0213±0.0005 AU
- Eccentricity: <0.03
- Orbital period (sidereal): 1.2436258±0.0000015 d
- Inclination: 84.7°±0.04° (Note: Planet orbital inclination (i) is given with respect to the sky plane.)
- Semi-amplitude: 48.8+1.1 −1.0 m/s
- Star: TOI-1853

Physical characteristics
- Mean radius: 3.46±0.08 R_{🜨} (0.309±0.007 R_{J})
- Mass: 73.2±2.7 M_{🜨} (0.230±0.008 M_{J})
- Mean density: 9.74+0.82 −0.76 g/cm^{3}
- Surface gravity: 60.1+3.8 −3.6 m/s^{2}
- Temperature: 1479±25 K

TOI-1853 b is a hot, massive, and dense Neptune-sized exoplanet orbiting the orange dwarf star TOI-1853, located in the constellation Boötes about 545 light-years (167 parsecs) away from Earth. It was discovered by the Transiting Exoplanet Survey Satellite (TESS) in 2020 and confirmed in 2023. The planet orbits close to its host star with an orbital period of 1.24 days, which gives it a high temperature of about 1,480 K (1,210 °C; 2,200 °F). With a mass 73 times Earth's (77% of Saturn's mass) and a radius 90% of Neptune's, TOI-1853 b has a very high density between 9 and 10 g/cm^{3}—nearly twice as dense as Earth and higher than that of steel. (Note: For reference, steel has a density between 7.75 and 8.05 g/cm^{3}.) The extremely high density of TOI-1853 b implies it is nearly entirely made of solid rock and water with a thin atmosphere of hydrogen and helium, which makes it a mega-Earth instead of a gas giant.

The high density of TOI-1853 b challenges the hypothesis that massive planets should form via pebble accretion. Two possible hypotheses have been proposed for the nature and origin of TOI-1853 b's density: it could either be a former gas giant whose atmosphere was stripped by its host star, or it could be a remnant of multiple collisions between super-Earths.

== Discovery ==
TESS first detected TOI-1853 b transiting its host star in early 2020. The planet was initially known as TOI-1853.01 until its confirmation in 2023. To confirm its planetary nature, a team of astronomers led by Luca Naponiello conducted follow-up observations using various telescopes from the ground. Naponiello's team observed additional transits by the planet in May and June 2020, searched for potential distant companions with high-resolution imaging in May–June 2020 and February 2021, and measured the planet's gravitational influence on its host star's radial velocity with Doppler spectroscopy between February 2021 and August 2022. After analyzing their results, Naponiello's team published their confirmation of TOI-1853 b in the journal Nature in August 2023.

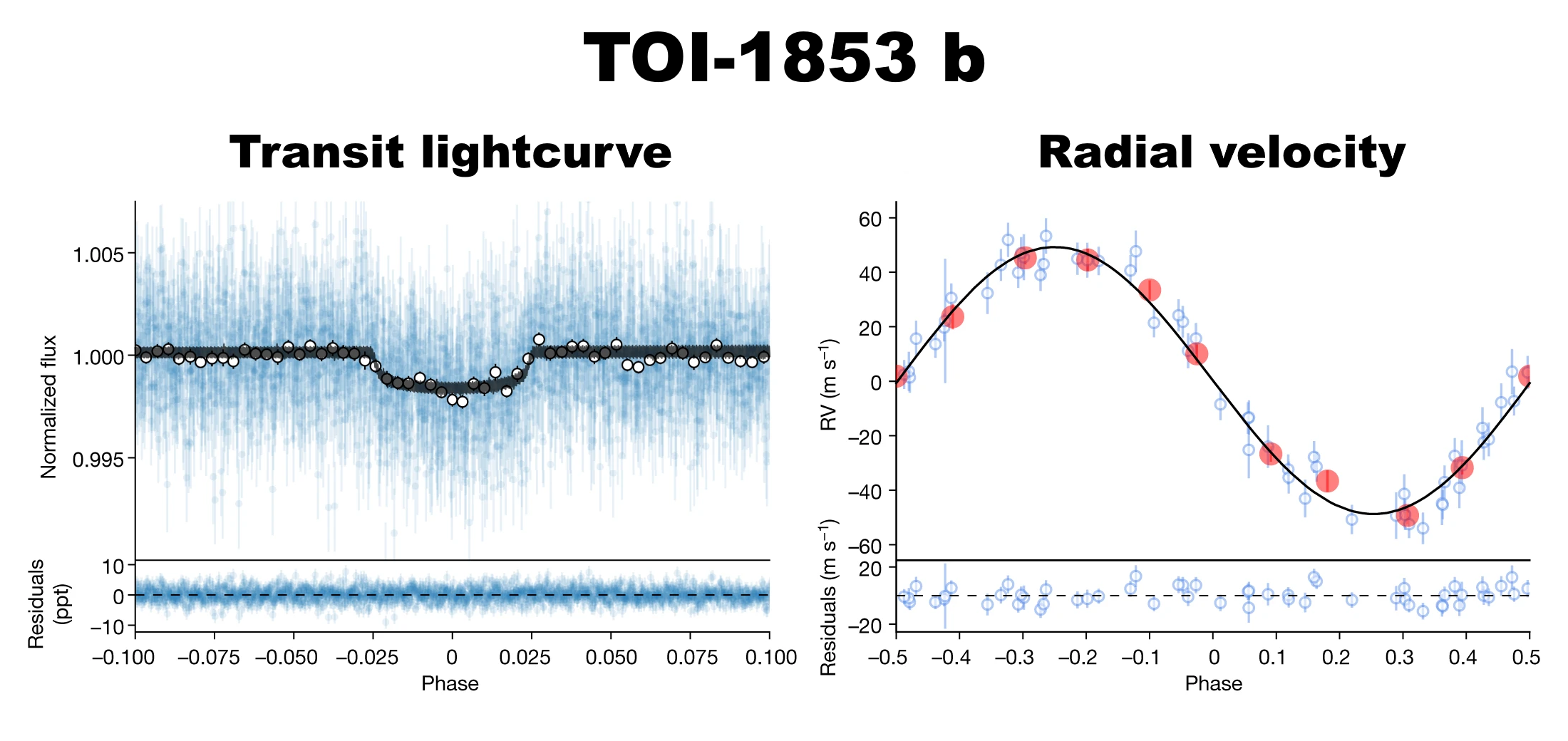
Detections of TOI-1853 b via transits (left plot) and radial velocity variations (right plot) in its host star. In the x-axis of both plots, "phase" represents elapsed time as a fraction of the planet's orbital period.

== Characteristics ==
=== Orbit and temperature ===
TOI-1853 b orbits close to its host star with a semi-major axis of 0.0213 AU (3.19 million km; 1.98 million mi) and an orbital period of 1.24 days. At this distance from its host star, TOI-1853 b is heated to an equilibrium temperature of about 1,480 K (1,210 °C; 2,200 °F). As a Neptune-sized planet, TOI-1853 b's close orbital distance to its host star makes it a rare example of a hot Neptune planet in the Neptunian desert—a region of orbital periods shorter than 3.2 days where very few Neptune-sized planets have been found. The apparent rarity of planets in the Neptunian desert is thought to be caused by their host star's intense radiation stripping off their atmospheres and radii. The orbit of TOI-1853 b is expected to be close to circular, with an upper limit eccentricity of <0.03.

The orbit of TOI-1853 b is inclined 84.7° with respect to the sky plane, which allows it to transit its host star from Earth's point of view. Viewed from Earth, TOI-1853 b takes about 1.19 hours to transit its host star. Although the planet's orbital inclination with respect to its host star's rotation axis is unknown, it is predicted that the planet's orbital inclination is aligned with its star's rotation due to tidal interactions. Tidal interactions between the planet and its star are also predicted to cause orbital decay; TOI-1853 is predicted to survive for at least 4 billion years into the future before it spirals into its host star.

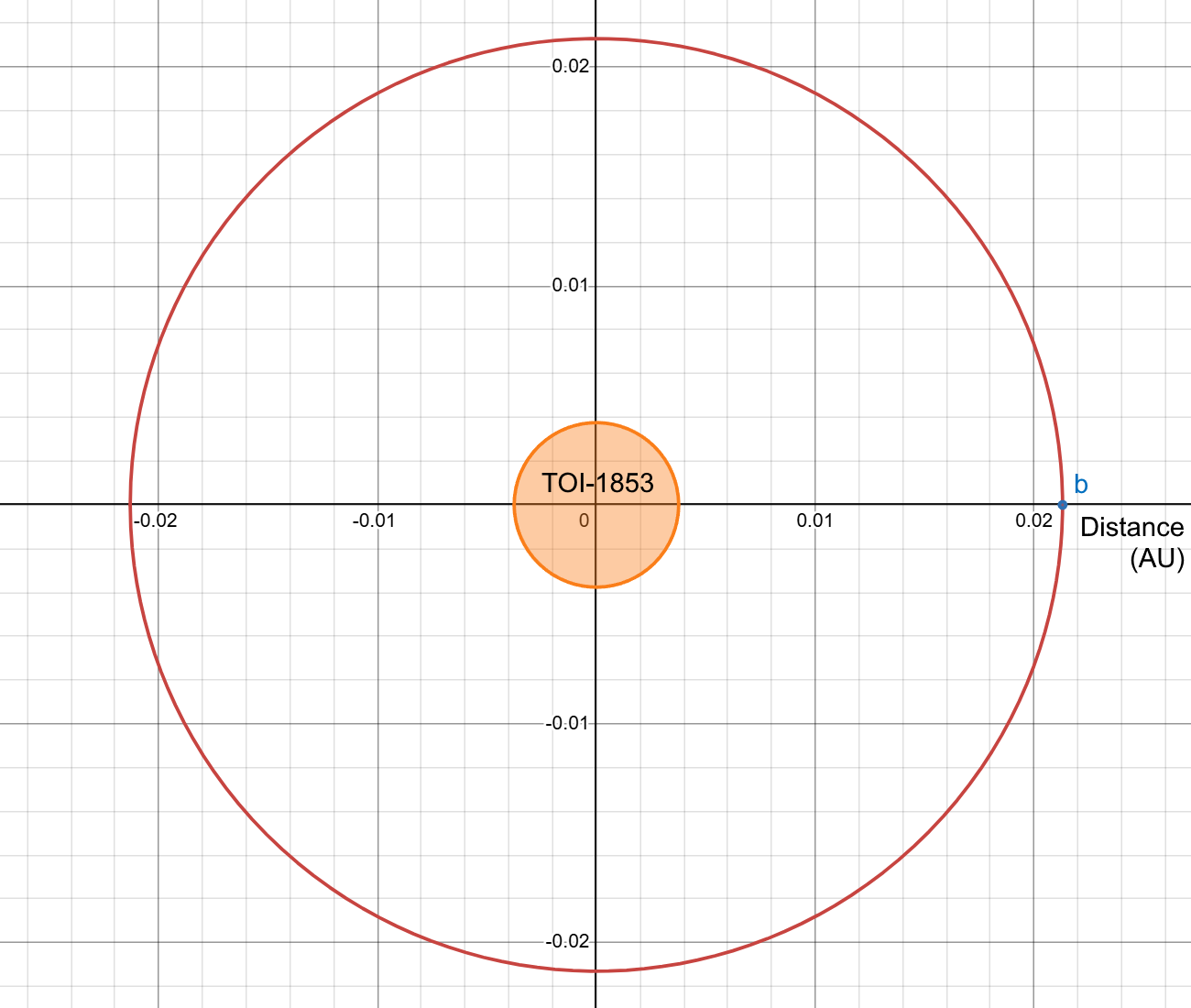
Diagram of TOI-1853 b's orbit viewed from above, with distances and radii to scale

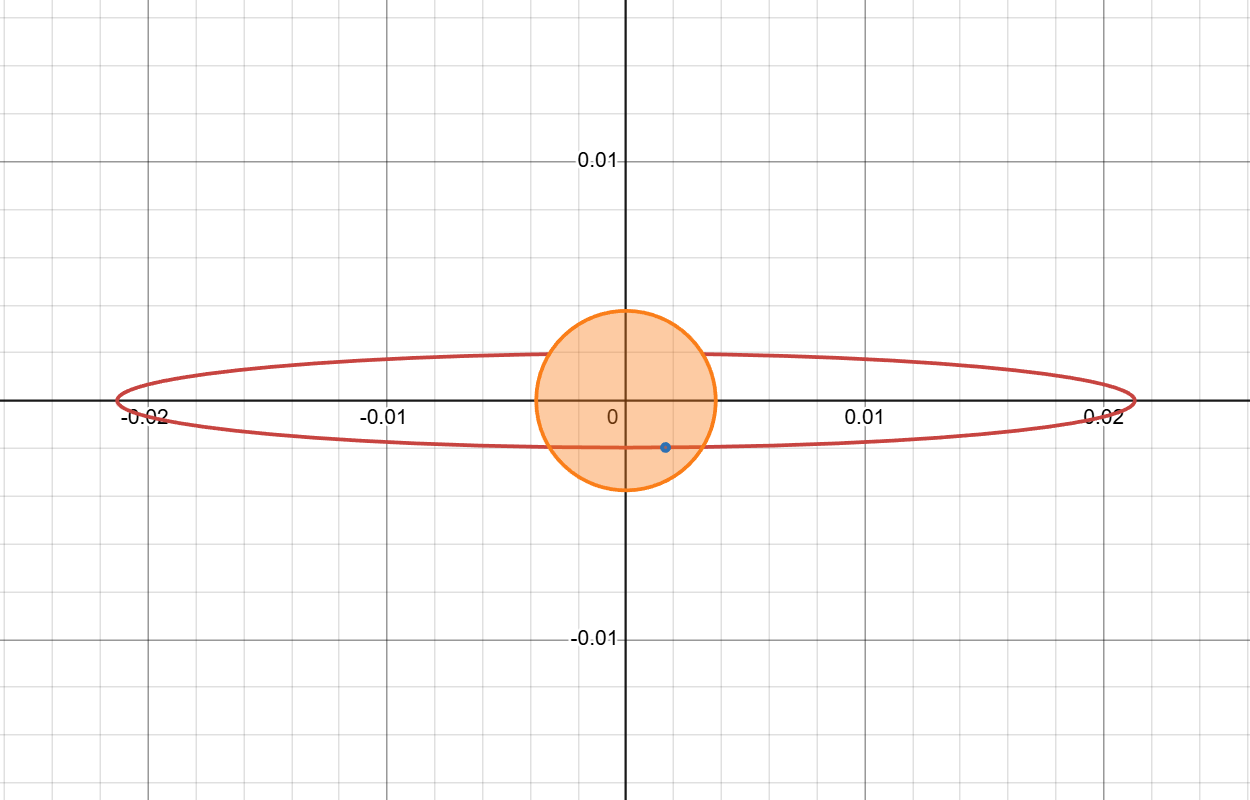
Diagram of TOI-1853 b's edge-on orbit as seen from Earth, with distances and radii to scale. The planet (blue dot) is depicted transiting its host star.

=== Physical properties ===
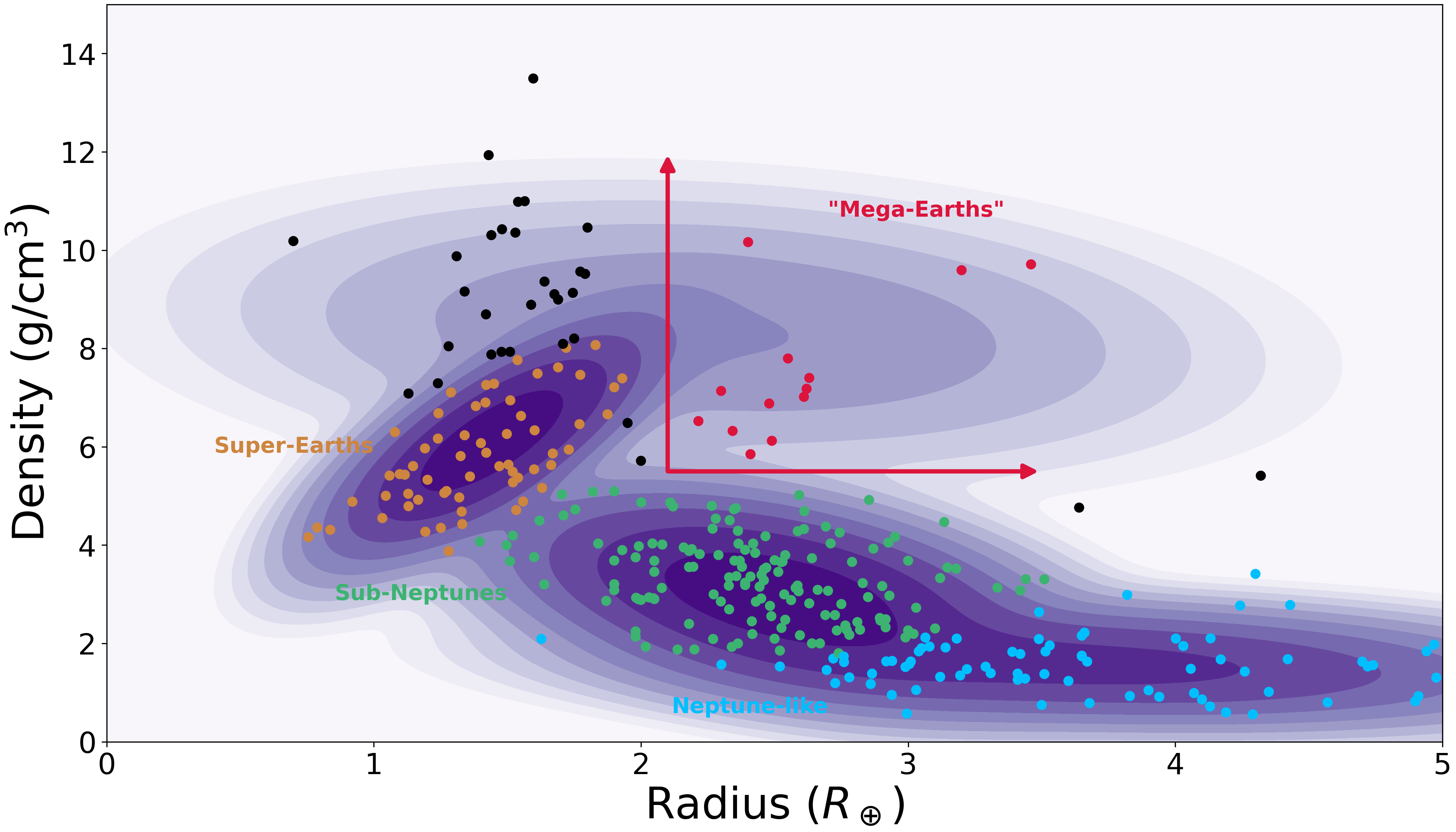
Scatter plot of measured radii and densities of known exoplanets as of March 2026. Mega-Earths (red points) have radii smaller than that of Neptune (2.1–5.0 R_{🜨}) and have densities higher than that of Earth (>5.5 g/cm^{3}). TOI-1853 b is the largest mega-Earth, represented as the red point farthest to the right in this plot.

TOI-1853 b is a Neptune-sized exoplanet with an unusually high mass and density. It is 73.2±2.7 times more massive than Earth (4.27× Neptune's mass (Note: Neptune has a mass of 1.024092×10^{26} kg, or 17.15 Earth masses.) or 76.9% Saturn's mass (Note: Saturn has a mass of 5.68317×10^{26} kg, or 95.16 Earth masses.)) and 3.46±0.08 times bigger than Earth in radius (89.5% Neptune's radius (Note: Neptune has an equatorial radius of 24764 km, or 3.86 Earth radii (equatorial).)). This gives the planet a very high surface gravity of 60.1+3.8
−3.6 m/s^{2} (6.13 times Earth's gravity) and a bulk density of 9.74+0.82
−0.76 g/cm^{3}—nearly twice as dense as Earth and denser than steel. This density is exceptionally high for a Neptune-sized giant planet; it implies that TOI-1853 b must be mostly solid and very rich in heavy elements—most likely in the form of rock and possibly ice—instead of gaseous hydrogen and helium like in typical gas giants. A 2026 study by Maxwell Kroft and colleagues proposed that TOI-1853 b belongs to a class of dense, Neptune-mass exoplanets called mega-Earths, which are defined as having radii between 2.1 and 5 Earth radii and densities greater than 5.5 g/cm^{3}. According to Kroft et al., only 13 mega-Earths have been confirmed as of March 2026, with the most massive one being TOI-1853 b.

==== Hypothesized composition ====
Although the composition of TOI-1853 b is unknown, it could be inferred from its density. In a 2023 study, Naponiello and colleagues proposed that TOI-1853 b's high density can be explained by two possible internal structures and compositions. One possible option has TOI-1853 b composed of 99% rock and metal and 1% atmosphere by mass. The other option has TOI-1853 b composed of 49.95% rock and metal, 49.95% water in the form of high-pressure ice and possibly supercritical fluid, and 0.1% atmosphere by mass. In both options, the thin atmosphere is assumed to be mostly hydrogen and helium (possibly containing steam if water-rich), and the rocky component of the planet is assumed to be differentiated into an iron core and a silicate mantle. The pressure of TOI-1853 b's deep interior is estimated to reach around 5,000 gigapascals (50 times the core–mantle boundary pressure of Earth), which is enough to cause most elements and their compounds to behave as metals. Naponiello et al. argued that a water-rich interior would be more likely if TOI-1853 b formed through planetary collisions.

Transmission spectroscopy and secondary eclipse observations (when the planet passes behind its star) by the James Webb Space Telescope (JWST) may be able to provide insights into the composition of TOI-1853 b's atmosphere and possibly its interior. Transmission spectroscopy may be able to distinguish a thin, hydrogen-dominated atmosphere from a water-dominated one, while secondary eclipse spectroscopy may be able to detect carbon dioxide and constrain the planet's atmospheric metallicity.

== Host star ==
TOI-1853
Observation data Epoch J2000.0 Equinox ICRS
- Constellation: Boötes
- Right ascension: 14^{h} 05^{m} 50.293^{s}
- Declination: +16° 59′ 32.72″

Characteristics
- Spectral type: K2.5V
- Apparent magnitude (B): 13.100±0.031
- Apparent magnitude (V): 12.276±0.092
- Apparent magnitude (J): 10.582±0.021
- Apparent magnitude (H): 10.175±0.018
- Apparent magnitude (K): 10.055±0.019

Astrometry
Radial velocity (R_{v})	−26.64±0.41 km/s
Proper motion (μ)	RA: −45.706±0.019 mas/yr Dec.: −12.183±0.012 mas/yr
Parallax (π)	6.0221±0.0159 mas
Distance	166.8+0.9 −0.5 pc

Details
Mass	0.837±0.039 M_{☉}
Radius	0.808±0.013 R_{☉}
Luminosity	0.3696±0.0093 L_{☉}
Surface gravity (log g)	4.49±0.11 cgs
Temperature	4985±70 K
Metallicity	[Mg/H] = 0.09±0.06 dex [Si/H] = 0.14±0.06 dex
Metallicity [Fe/H]	0.11±0.08 dex
Rotational velocity (v sin i)	1.3±0.9 km/s
Age	7.0+4.6 −4.3 Gyr

Other designations
- TIC 73540072, TYC 1468-1031-1, 2MASS J14055031+1659326

Database references
SIMBAD	data

TOI-1853 is a main sequence star of spectral type K2.5V (an orange dwarf), located in the constellation Boötes about 545 light-years (167 parsecs) away from Earth. It is a relatively quiet star with little stellar activity, and has a optical (V-band) apparent magnitude of 12.3. It was first catalogued by the European Space Agency's (ESA) Hipparcos satellite and published in the Tycho-2 (TYC) catalogue in 2000. The star received the designations TIC 7354007 and TOI-1853 when it was first observed by the Transiting Exoplanet Survey Satellite (TESS) in 2020. The star is about 80% as large as the Sun in terms of both mass and radius, and is about 37% as luminous as the Sun. The star is also cooler than the Sun with an effective temperature of nearly 5,000 K (4,730 °C; 8,540 °F).

Spectroscopic observations of TOI-1853 show that it has a higher metallicity than the Sun, having iron, magnesium, and silicon abundances roughly 1.25 times higher than that of the Sun. (Note: For a given element Z, the star's metallicity [Z/H] is given as the base 10 logarithm of the ratio of the star's element-to-hydrogen ratio to the Sun's element-to-hydrogen ratio. That is to say: $[Z/H] {{=}} \log_{10}\left( \frac{(Z/H)_{star}}{(Z/H)_{\odot}} \right)$. For iron (Fe), magnesium (Mg), and silicon (Si), their measured metallicities in TOI-1853 are [Fe/H] = 0.11±0.08, [Mg/H] = 0.09±0.06, and [Si/H] = 0.14±0.06, respectively. The star's abundance of these elements relative to the Sun can be obtained by plugging in these values in the exponent of $10^{[Z/H]}$, which gives ≈1.29, ≈1.23, and ≈1.38, for Fe, Mg, and Si, respectively (ignoring uncertainties).) The star appears to be slowly rotating with a projected (minimum) rotational velocity of 1.3±0.9 km/s. The star's observed properties suggest it has an old age of 7.0+4.6
−4.3 billion years. The ESA's Gaia satellite has measured the star's parallax distance and movement through space: it has measured a westward right ascension proper motion of −45.7 milliarcseconds per year (mas/yr), (Note: Positive right ascension is eastward.) a southward declination proper motion of −12.2 mas/yr, (Note: Positive declination is northward.) and a radial velocity of about −26.6±0.4 km/s (toward the Sun).

TOI-1853 appears to be a single star. High-resolution imaging by the Keck, Gemini, and SOAR telescopes in 2020–2021 found no evidence of closely-orbiting stellar companions beyond a fraction of an arcsecond from TOI-1853, while analysis of Gaia data found no evidence of distant, co-moving stellar companions within 40 arcseconds (~7,000 astronomical units) from TOI-1853.

== Origin ==
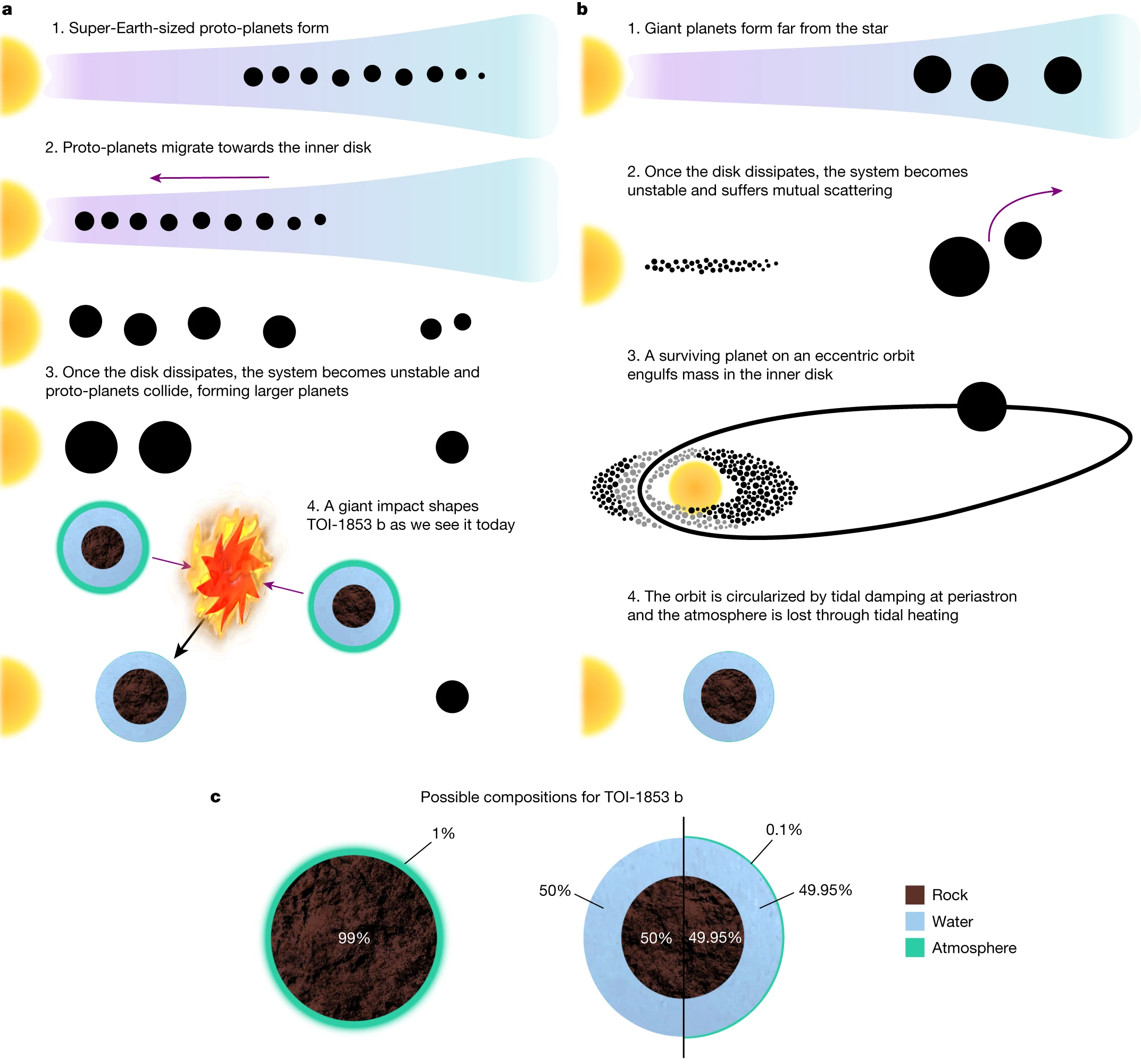
Two possible scenarios for the formation and internal structure of TOI-1853 b. The scenario on the left proposes that the planet could be a rocky remnant of multiple collisions between super-Earths, whereas the scenario on the right proposes that the planet could be a former gas giant that migrated toward its host star and became stripped of its atmosphere.

The high density and presumed high abundance of heavy elements in TOI-1853 b could not be explained by the conventional theory that massive planets should form via pebble accretion in a protoplanetary disk. In pebble accretion, a massive planet would eventually accrete a substantial amount of gas and become a gas giant. Forming a massive, high-density planet like TOI-1853 b via pebble accretion would require an unrealistically high concentration of non-gaseous material in the protoplanetary disk. In a 2023 study, Naponiello et al. proposed two hypotheses for the formation and nature of TOI-1853 b: it could either be a former gas giant that migrated toward its host star and lost its atmosphere to intensified heating, or it could be a remnant of multiple collisions between super-Earths.

=== Stripped gas giant hypothesis ===
In this hypothesis, TOI-1853 b was originally a Jupiter-sized gas giant that formed far from its host star. After the star's protoplanetary disk dissipated, TOI-1853 b's orbit became highly eccentric and inclined due to interactions with neighboring giant planets. This highly eccentric and inclined orbit brought TOI-1853 b closer to its host star, where it began heating up due to accreting leftover material, receiving greater irradiance, and experiencing strong tidal interactions (tidal heating) by its host star. Over time, the planet expanded and lost most of its atmosphere, and its orbit became tidally circularized and aligned to its host star. A 2025 study by Shreyas Vissapragada and Aida Behmard argued that this is a more likely scenario for the formation of Neptunian-desert planets like TOI-1853 b, which appear to preferentially occur around stars with similar metallicities as stars hosting gas giants.

=== Planetary collision hypothesis ===
In this hypothesis, TOI-1853 b is the product of multiple collisions between super-Earth-sized protoplanets early in the TOI-1853 system's history. These protoplanets are thought to have formed far from their host star, but migrated inward. After the star's protoplanetary disk dissipated, the protoplanets began colliding with one another, building up planets with increasing mass and rock fractions until few planets remain. However, all of these protoplanets likely had lower densities because they likely had substantial atmospheres and water. In order to remove these low-density materials, the planetary collisions must be highly energetic, with speeds faster than the mutual escape velocity of the colliding planets. A higher number of consecutive energetic collisions would lead to a higher rock mass fraction for TOI-1853 b; if TOI-1853 b's composition is predominantly rocky with no water, then the total initial mass of the constituent protoplanets must have to be roughly ten times the final mass of TOI-1853 b, which is an unlikely scenario. Simulations from Naponiello et al.'s 2023 study suggest that planetary collisions are more efficient at removing atmospheres if the colliding planets are rich in water, meaning that a water-rich composition for TOI-1853 b may be easier to produce than a water-free rocky composition. However, the 2025 study by Vissapragada and Behmard argued that this is a less likely scenario for the formation of Neptunian-desert planets like TOI-1853 b, which appear to preferentially occur around stars with significantly higher metallicities than stars hosting smaller planets (<10 M_{🜨}; includes super-Earths).

== Similar exoplanets ==
As one of the few known hot Neptune exoplanets in the Neptunian desert (as of February 2025), TOI-1853 b shares some similarities with others in this population. In particular, the majority of Neptunian-desert planets are relatively dense (>1 g/cm^{3}) for their high masses (10–50 M_{🜨}) and have been hypothesized to be evaporated remnants of gas giants. At the extreme end of the Neptunian desert's mass and density range, there are two previously known exoplanets that rival TOI-1853 b's high mass and density: these are TOI-849 b (mass 39.1+2.7
−2.6 M_{🜨}; density 5.2+0.7
−0.8 g/cm^{3}) and TOI-332 b (mass 57.2±1.6 M_{🜨}; density 9.6+1.1
−1.3 g/cm^{3}). Like TOI-1853 b, both of these exoplanets are thought to be mostly solid with thin atmospheres of hydrogen and helium, and may have either come from evaporated gas giants or collisions between planets.

== See also ==
- Chthonian planet
- Hot Neptune
- Super-Neptune
