= Neptunian desert =

Region around stars where hot Neptunes are rare

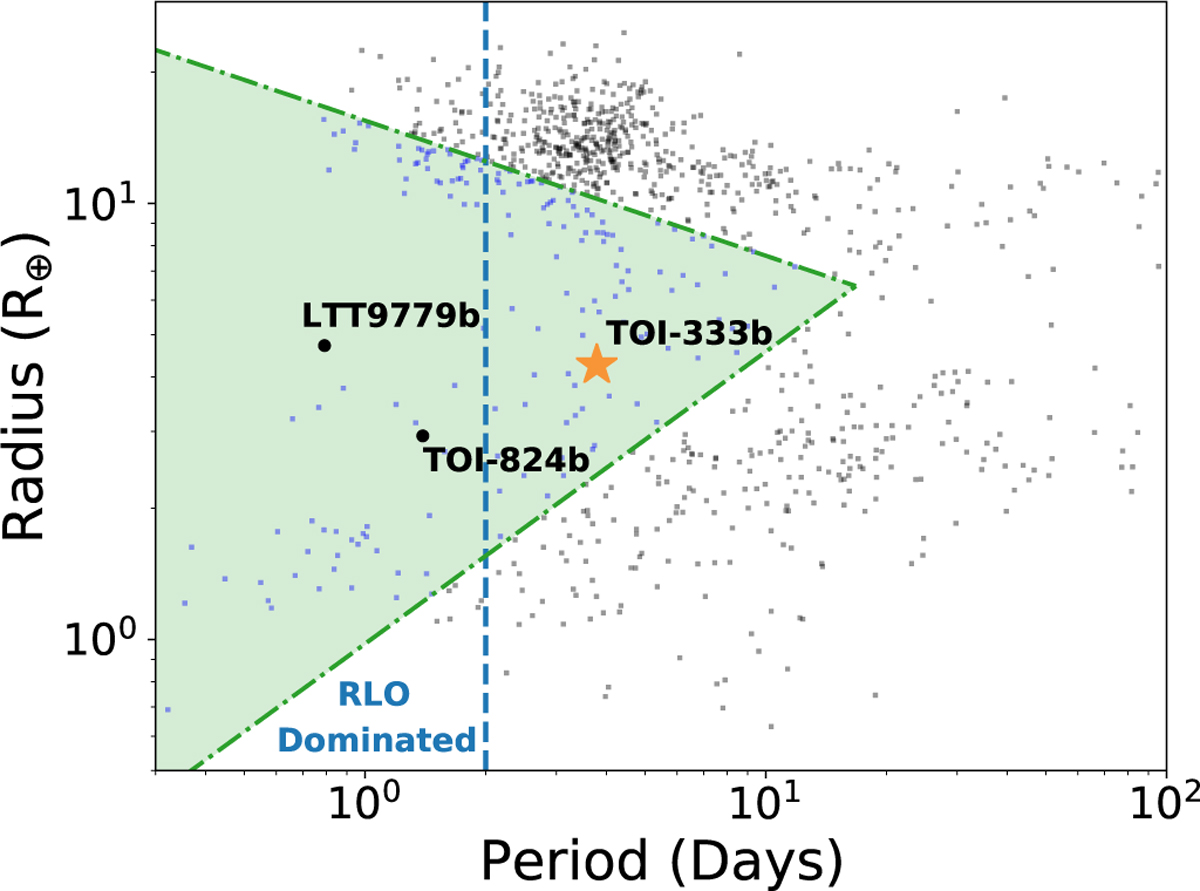
Scatter plot of measured radii and orbital periods of known exoplanets as of August 2025. The Neptunian desert is the triangular region shaded in green. Three planets in the Neptunian desert are labeled in black; the vertical blue line marks the threshold at which planets begin losing atmospheres to Roche lobe overflow.

The Neptunian desert or sub-Jovian desert is the region close to a star (orbital periods less than 3.2 days) where very few Neptune-sized (4–10 R_{🜨} or 10–100 M_{🜨}) exoplanets are found. This zone receives strong irradiation from the star, meaning the planets cannot retain their gaseous atmospheres: they evaporate, leaving just a rocky core.

Neptune-sized planets should be easier to find in short-period orbits as the radial velocity and transit methods—two common exoplanet detection methods—detect short-period planets more readily. However, of the many short-period planets found by survey telescopes like CoRoT and Kepler, few are Neptune-sized; many are significantly smaller or larger than Neptune. The physical mechanisms that result in the observed Neptunian desert are currently unknown, but have been suggested to be due to a different formation mechanism for short-period super-Earth and Jovian exoplanets, similar to the reasons for the brown-dwarf desert.

== Definition and history ==
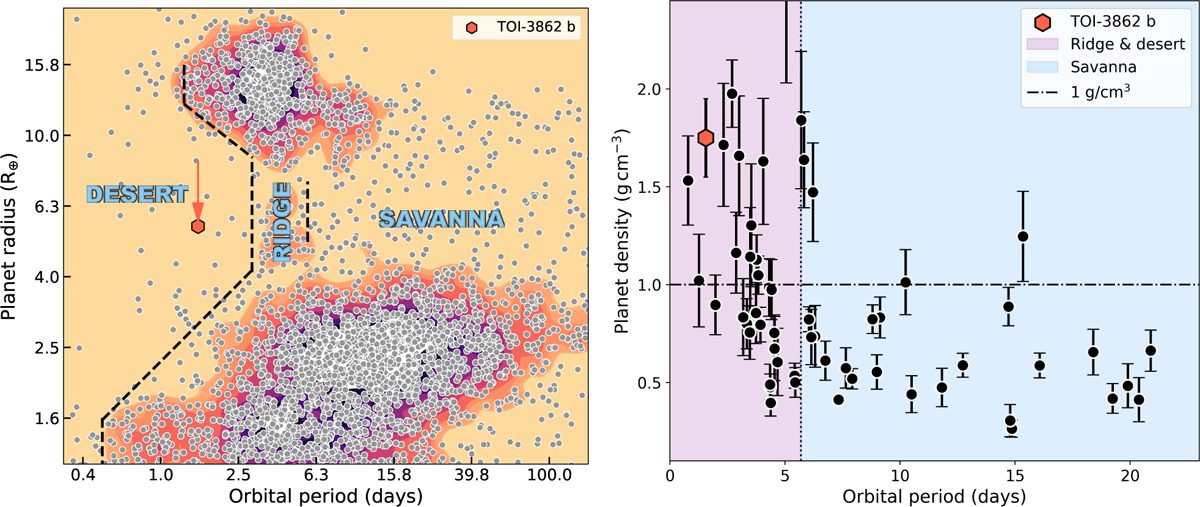
Scatter plots of measured exoplanet radii versus orbital periods (left) and measured exoplanet densities versus orbital periods (right). The left plot shows the Neptunian desert, ridge, and savanna labeled, while the right plot shows a sharp jump in exoplanet densities within the Neptunian desert. Data as of September 2025.

In the scientific literature, the Neptunian desert or sub-Jovian desert is defined as the region close to a star (orbital periods less than 3.2 days) where very few Neptune-sized exoplanets are found. For the definition of "Neptune-sized", studies have either used a mass range of 10–100 Earth masses (M_{🜨}) or a radius range of 4–10 Earth radii (R_{🜨}). The 3.2-day orbital period cutoff for the Neptunian desert's outer edge is based on a 2024 statistical analysis of measured masses and orbital periods known exoplanets. Beyond the Neptunian desert's edge is the "Neptunian ridge", where there is an overdensity of planets with orbital periods between 3.2 and 5.7 days separating the desert from the "Neptunian savanna", a moderately populated region at larger orbital distances. According to a 2026 study the ridge is an artifact of the data analysis used and does not actually exist.

The Neptunian desert was first reported by Gyula M. Szabó and Laszlo L. Kiss in a 2011 study of the known population of transiting exoplanets. In that study, Szabó and Kiss coined the term "sub-Jovian desert". As more exoplanets became discovered by survey telescopes such as CoRoT and Kepler, various independent teams reported similar findings of the Neptunian desert's absence of planets. It became clear that the apparent lack of planets in the Neptunian desert could not be due to observational bias; Neptune-sized planets should be easier to find in short-period orbits than both smaller planets in similar orbits and Neptune-sized planets in longer period orbits, yet surveys at the time have already found numerous short-period exoplanets that are significantly smaller or larger than Neptune. It was not until 2019 that astronomers announced the first discovery of an exoplanet inside the Neptunian desert, NGTS-4b (mass 20.6±3.0 M_{🜨}, radius 3.18±0.26 R_{🜨}, period 1.34 days).

== Physical properties and origin ==
Two independent studies from 2025 have found that exoplanets in the Neptunian desert preferentially occur around metal-rich stars, unlike more distant hot Neptunes. Stars hosting Neptunian-desert planets share similar metallicities as stars hosting gas giants, and have significantly higher metallicities than stars hosting smaller (<10 M_{🜨}) planets.

A majority of exoplanets in the Neptunian desert have been found to be relatively dense (>1 g/cm^{3}) for their high masses (10–50 M_{🜨}). These high-density planets are thought to be mostly solid with thin atmospheres of hydrogen and helium, in contrast to gas giant planets. The solid material thought to make up these dense planets includes rock, metal, and ice. A 2025 census of measured masses and densities of known planets in the Neptunian desert found that planets with orbital periods shorter than 3.5 days (equilibrium temperatures above 1300 K) have distinctly higher densities, presumably due to having smaller amounts of gas relative to their solid core (a lower envelope mass fraction). In particular, planets orbiting within 3.5 days have estimated envelope mass fractions of nearly zero (implying a predominantly solid composition), whereas planets orbiting beyond 3.5 days have estimated envelope mass fractions around 20% to 40%. The split in envelope mass fraction nearly coincides with the 3.2-day cutoff for the Neptunian desert's edge, which suggests that the Neptunian desert arises from physical phenomena such as planetary migration and subsequent evaporation by the star's intense heat.

Some planets in the Neptunian desert have been found to have exceptionally high bulk densities that are comparable or greater than that of Earth: these include TOI-1853 b (mass 73.2±2.7 M_{🜨}; density 9.74+0.82
−0.76 g/cm^{3}), TOI-849 b (mass 39.1+2.7
−2.6 M_{🜨}; density 5.2+0.7
−0.8 g/cm^{3}), and TOI-332 b (mass 57.2±1.6 M_{🜨}; density 9.6+1.1
−1.3 g/cm^{3}). The extremely high densities of these planets could not explained by conventional theories of planetary formation, where planets accrete material from a protoplanetary disk. Instead, astronomers have proposed two competing hypotheses for the origin of dense planets in the Neptunian desert.

=== Stripped gas giant hypothesis ===
In this hypothesis, Neptunian-desert planets were originally Jupiter-sized gas giants that formed far from their host star. After the star's protoplanetary disk dissipates, the planet's orbit becomes highly eccentric and inclined due to interactions with neighboring giant planets. This highly eccentric and inclined orbit brings the planet closer to its host star, where it begins heating up due to a combination of accreting leftover material, receiving greater irradiance, and experiencing strong tidal interactions (tidal heating) with its host star. Over time, the planet expands and loses most of its atmosphere, and its orbit becomes tidally circularized and aligned with its host star. A 2025 study by Shreyas Vissapragada and Aida Behmard argued that this is a more likely scenario for the formation of Neptunian-desert planets, which appear to preferentially occur around stars with similar metallicities as stars hosting gas giants.

=== Planetary collision hypothesis ===
This hypothesis suggests that planets in the Neptunian desert are the end product of multiple collisions between smaller protoplanets that are each several Earth masses. Although the protoplanets may have lower densities due to having high amounts of volatiles, these can be eliminated if the collision is energetic enough (involving collision speeds faster than the planets' mutual escape velocity). With each consecutive collision, the resulting planet's rock fraction and bulk density increases. However, the 2025 study by Vissapragada and Behmard argued that this is a less likely scenario for the formation of Neptunian-desert planets, which appear to preferentially occur around stars with significantly higher metallicities than stars hosting smaller planets (<10 M_{🜨}; includes super-Earths).

== Atmospheres ==
As of 2025, only one exoplanet in the Neptunian desert has a determined atmospheric composition. This exoplanet, LTT 9779 b (mass 29.32+0.78
−0.81 M_{🜨}, radius 4.72±0.23 R_{🜨}, period 0.792 days), has been studied by the James Webb Space Telescope (JWST) via transmission spectroscopy and the Hubble Space Telescope (HST) via observations of eclipses by the host star. LTT 9779 b was found to have an asymmetric dayside hemisphere, with highly reflective white silicate (enstatite and forsterite) clouds on the western dayside (albedo 0.79±0.15) and a darker eastern dayside (0.41±0.10). The planet has a measured dayside effective temperature of 2,260 K (1,990 °C; 3,610 °F) and a cooler nightside temperature of <1,330 K (1,060 °C; 1,930 °F), which may drive a super-rotating equatorial jet stream that transports heat eastwards from the dayside to the nightside. The atmosphere of LTT 9779 b may dominated by steam or carbon dioxide.

One planet at the edge of the Neptunian desert, WASP-166b (mass 32.1±1.6 M_{🜨}, radius 6.9±0.3 R_{🜨}, period 5.44 days), has had its atmosphere studied by the JWST. WASP-166 b was found to have an atmosphere containing mostly steam and carbon dioxide, with weak evidence of ammonia. When compared to the Neptunian-desert planet LTT 9779 b, WASP-166 b is significantly puffier (has lower density), has less cloud coverage, and has a comparably larger atmospheric scale height due to its larger radius. A 2025 comparative study between LTT 9779 b and WASP-166 b suggests that the planets avoid rapid atmospheric loss via two different ways: LTT 9779 b limits its atmospheric loss with clouds, whereas WASP-166 b limits atmospheric loss with its cooler temperature and farther distance from its host star.

== See also ==
- Brown-dwarf desert
- Hot Neptune
- Hot Jupiter
- Chthonian planet
- Planetary migration
