= Hydrodynamic escape =

Method by which atoms of a planet's atmosphere are ejected into space

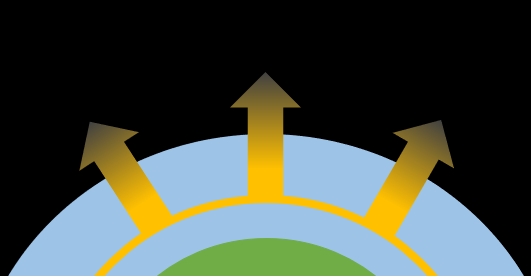
Schematic of hydrodynamic escape. Energy from solar radiation is deposited in a thin shell. This energy heats the atmosphere, which then begins to expand. This expansion continues into the vacuum of space, accelerating as it goes until it escapes.

In atmospheric science, hydrodynamic escape is a thermal atmospheric escape mechanism that can lead to the escape of heavier atoms of a planetary atmosphere through numerous collisions with lighter atoms, typically hydrogen. This mechanism may explain why some planetary atmospheres are depleted in oxygen, nitrogen, and heavier noble gases, such as xenon.This process can be thought of like planetary winds where solar radiation heats up the upper atmosphere a lot, eventually leading to lighter atoms escaping and creating a flow that helps drag the heavier ones along.

== Description ==
Particles in the atmosphere need to achieve sufficiently high velocity (higher than the escape velocity) to escape from the planetary gravity field. There are different ways to achieve this velocity. Those processes in which the high velocity is related to the temperature are called thermal escape. The root mean square thermal velocity (v_{th}) of an atomic species is $v_\mathrm{th} = \sqrt{\frac{3kT}{m}}$

where k is the Boltzmann constant, T is the temperature, and m is the mass of the species. Lighter molecules or atoms will therefore be moving faster than heavier molecules or atoms at the same temperature. Thus they are easier to escape from planetary gravity field. This is why atomic hydrogen escapes preferentially from an atmosphere.

If there is a strong thermally driven atmospheric escape of light atoms, heavier atoms can achieve the escape velocity through viscous drag by those escaping lighter atoms. This is another way of thermal escape, called hydrodynamic escape. The heaviest species of atom that can be removed in this manner is called the cross-over mass.

In order to maintain a significant hydrodynamic escape, a large source of energy at a certain altitude is required. Soft X-ray or extreme ultraviolet radiation (solar EUV heating), momentum transfer from impacting meteoroids or asteroids, or the heat input from planetary accretion processes may provide the requisite energy for hydrodynamic escape. Such conditions may have been reached in H- or He-rich thermospheres heated by the strong extreme ultraviolet radiation flux of the young Sun. Thus hydrodynamic escape is more likely to occur in the early atmosphere of planets.

== Hydrodynamic escape flux ==
Estimating the rate of hydrodynamic escape is important in analyzing both the history and current state of a planet's atmosphere. In 1981, Watson et al. published calculations that describe energy-limited escape, where all incoming energy is balanced by escape to space. Recent numerical simulations on exoplanets have suggested that this calculation overestimates the hydrodynamic flux by 20 - 100 times.^{[30]} However, as a special case and upper limit approximation on the atmospheric escape, it is worth noting here.

Hydrodynamic escape flux (Φ, [m^{-2}s^{-1}]) in an energy-limited escape can be calculated, assuming (1) an atmosphere composed of non-viscous, (2) constant-molecular-weight gas, with (3) isotropic pressure, (4) fixed temperature, (5) perfect extreme ultraviolet (XUV) absorption, and that (6) pressure decreases to zero as distance from the planet increases.

Hydrodynamic escape flux of hydrogen $\Phi_H$ can be expressed as:

$$\Phi_H=\frac{F_\mathrm{XUV} R_p R_\mathrm{XUV}^2}{G M_p}$$

where (in SI units):

- F_{XUV} is the photon flux [J m^{-2}s^{-1}] over the wavelengths of interest,
- R_{p} is the radius of the planet [m],
- G is the gravitational constant [ms^{-2}],
- M_{p} is the mass of the planet [kg],
- R_{XUV} is the effective radius where the XUV absorption occurs [m].

Corrections to this model have been proposed over the years to account for the Roche lobe of a planet and efficiency in absorbing photon flux.

However, as computational power has improved, increasingly sophisticated models have emerged, incorporating radiative transfer, photochemistry, and hydrodynamics that provide better estimates of hydrodynamic escape.

On the other hand, the hydrodynamic escape flux of heavier species $\Phi_i$ can be expressed as:

$\Phi_i=(\Phi_H-\frac{(m_i-m_H)gb(i,H)}{kT})f_i$

where

- $m_H, m_i$ are the masses of hydrogen and of heavier atoms i,
- $g$ is the acceleration due to the gravitational field,
- $k$ is the Boltzmann constant,
- $T$ is the temperature,
- $b(i,H)$ is the binary diffusion coefficient,
- $f_i$ is the mixing ratio of heavier atoms i divided by the mixing ratio of hydrogen.

It can be observed from this formula that the hydrodynamic escape flux of heavier species is higher for less heavier atoms, which is discussed in detail in the next section.

== Isotope fractionation as evidence ==
Hydrodynamic escape is a mass fractionating process since all isotopes are dragged by protons with the same force but heavy isotopes are more gravitationally bound compared to light ones. Therefore, hydrogen preferentially drags lighter isotopes to space, leaving the residual atmosphere enriched in heavier isotopes. This is why the ratio of lighter to heavier isotopes of atmospheric particles can indicate hydrodynamic escape.

Specifically, the ratio of different noble gas isotopes (^{20}Ne/^{22}Ne, ^{36}Ar/^{38}Ar, ^{78,80,82,83,86}Kr/^{84}Kr, ^{124,126,128,129,131,132,134,136}Xe/^{130}Xe) or hydrogen isotopes (D/H) can be compared to solar levels to indicate likelihood of hydrodynamic escape in the atmospheric evolution. Ratios larger or smaller than compared with that in the sun or CI chondrites, which are used as proxy for the sun, indicate that significant hydrodynamic escape has occurred since the formation of the planet. Since lighter atoms preferentially escape, we expect smaller ratios for the noble gas isotopes (or a larger D/H) correspond to a greater likelihood of hydrodynamic escape, as indicated in the table.

Isotopic fractionation in Venus, Earth, and Mars
Source	36Ar/38Ar	20Ne/22Ne	82Kr/84Kr	128Xe/130Xe
Sun	5.8	13.7	20.501	50.873
CI chondrites	5.3±0.05	8.9±1.3	20.149±0.080	50.73±0.38
Venus	5.56±0.62	11.8±0.7	--	--
Earth	5.320±0.002	9.800±0.08	20.217±0.021	47.146±0.047
Mars	4.1±0.2	10.1±0.7	20.54±0.20	47.67±1.03

Matching these ratios can also be used to validate or verify computational models seeking to describe atmospheric evolution. This method has also been used to determine the escape of oxygen relative to hydrogen in early atmospheres.

== Detection Methods ==
Currently the main way which we can measure hydrodynamic escape for other planets not within our solar system is limited. The main way in which we can detect hydrodynamic escape in exoplanet atmospheres is through transit spectroscopy. This is when we look at distant stars and measure the amount of light that they give off and look for small dips in the amount of light that we are measuring from the star. These dips can sometimes be planets although they have to be deciphered from other variations in a stars luminosity such as flares. This method was actually used with the Hubble Space Telescope and allowed the detection of the exoplanet HD 209458 b while it is theorized that it was experiencing hydrodynamic escape.

== Effects on Habitability ==
Because hydrodynamic escape can have large effects on both atmosphere composition and available water on a planet, it can play a vital role in determining how habitable a planet. Through Photodissociation water molecules can be broken down into hydrogen and oxygen allowing the hydrogen to escape as part of hydrodynamic escape and even bring some water with it. This process can deplete a planet's water reserve over time while also allowing for more hydrogen to feed the escape of other molecules further altering the atmospheric composition of the planet. While things such as a planet's magnetic field may aid in reducing atmospheric loss by deflecting charged particles its effects on hydrodynamic escape have not been directly tested or studied.

== Examples ==
Exoplanets that are extremely close to their parent star, such as hot Jupiters can experience significant hydrodynamic escape to the point where the star "burns off" their atmosphere upon which they cease to be gas giants and are left with just the core, at which point they would be called Chthonian planets. Hydrodynamic escape has been observed for exoplanets close to their host star, including the hot Jupiters HD 209458b.

Within a stellar lifetime, the solar flux may change. Younger stars produce more EUV, and the early protoatmospheres of Earth, Mars, and Venus likely underwent hydrodynamic escape, which accounts for the noble gas isotope fractionation present in their atmospheres.

Earth earlier in its lifespan likely had a much more hydrogen rich atmosphere that was stripped away by this process and also likely led to the isotope fraction mentioned. It also likely increased oxidation on early Earth due to the photodissociation of water leaving behind oxygen. While some oxygen likely escaped with other heavier molecules, what was left would contribute to early oxidation of Banded iron formations and other deposits.

Mars is one of the planets today that is currently experiencing atmospheric loss and is being actively measured. Some current models are suggesting that hydrodynamic escape on early Mars could have aided in the overall drying and cooling of the martian climate that we observe today.

Venus is of particular interest for planetary scientists because of its extreme atmospheric pressure and temperature. These conditions likely increased hydrodynamic escape on early Venus, coupled with the increased EUV from a younger sun a lot of the water that was present on Venus accumulated in the upper atmosphere and was then broken down allowing hydrogen to escape allowing it to being pulling other larger molecules with it. This is thought to be a heavy contributing factor to why Venus is so dry today and is backed up by the increased deuterium to hydrogen ration in the atmosphere. Studies also indicate that Venus likely lost most of its hydrogen within the first few hundred million years of the solar system forming, which would align with a heightened period of EUV and therefor hydrodynamic escape.

It can be observed from the above table that atmospheric Xe experiences more fractionation than Kr, which seems unreasonable since Xe is heavier than Kr and should be less influenced by hydrodynamic escape than Kr. Actually, according to the formula of hydrodynamic escape flux $\Phi_i$ above, it requires extreme high $\Phi_H$, which can only be achieved during the first 100 Ma of Earth's history when the EUV flux from the young Sun was sufficiently strong. However, from the analysis of ancient atmospheric gases trapped in fluid inclusions contained in minerals of Archean (3.3 Ga) to Paleozoic (404 Ma) rocks, it has been observed that the fractionation of atmospheric Xe was still ongoing at about 2.1 Ga before.

One possible explanation is that Xe may be the only noble gas which escapes as an ion as it is the only noble gas more easily ionized than hydrogen. Ionized Xe^{+} can interact with H^{+} protons via the strong Coulomb force, which effectively decreases the binary diffusion coefficient b(Xe^{+}, H^{+}) by several orders of magnitude compared to the case of neutral Xe. That means it needs lower hydrogen escape fluxes $\Phi_H$ compared with neutral Xe. Actually, its requisite $\Phi_H$ is lower enough to be met during Archean eon, which means the mass-fractionated hydrodynamic escape of Xe can persist during Archean.
