= TOI-849 b =

Possible chthonian planet)

Discovery
- Discovered by: TESS
- Discovery date: 2020
- Detection method: Transit

Orbital characteristics
- Semi-major axis: 0.01598+0.00013 −0.00014 AU
- Orbital period (sidereal): 0.76552414+0.00000262 −0.00000279 d
- Inclination: 86.8°+2.1° −2.4°
- Star: TOI-849

Physical characteristics
- Mean radius: 3.444+0.157 −0.115 R_{🜨}
- Mass: 39.09+2.66 −2.55 M_{🜨}
- Mean density: 5.2+0.7 −0.8 g/cm^{3}

TOI-849 b is an exoplanet orbiting the late-G type star TOI-849. It is a candidate chthonian planet, the exposed core of a gas giant that had much of its atmosphere stripped away. It is around 700 light-years away from Earth.

== Characteristics ==
TOI-849 b is a high-density planet more massive than Neptune, around 40 times the mass of Earth. It orbits very close to TOI-849, with a period of less than one day, placing it within the Neptunian desert.

Compared to other Neptune-sized exoplanets, this planet is unusually massive and dense. It is around 40 times the mass of Earth, but only about 3.4 times Earth's diameter. This implies that any gaseous envelope of hydrogen and helium makes up at most 3.9+0.8
−0.9 percent of the planet's mass. However, given the planet's size, its density is still too low for a purely rocky composition.

The gravity of such a massive planet would be expected to accrete large amounts of gas from the protoplanetary disk in which it formed, causing it to become a gas giant. It is thought that TOI-849 b could be the remnant core of a gas giant. A 2021 modeling study found that the stellar radiation received by the planet could have removed the entire gaseous envelope even if it formed as a Jupiter-mass planet.

== See also ==
- Chthonian planet
- Mega-Earth
- Hot Neptune
- Super-Neptune
- TOI-1853 b, another example of a dense and massive giant planet in the Neptunian desert
