= Stars proposed in religion =

Stars proposed in religion may include:

- Kolob, a star proposed in Mormon cosmology
- The Star of Bethlehem, the star that supposedly marked the birth of Christ
- Wormwood (Bible), a star said to fall to Earth in the Book of Revelation
- Seven Suns, prophesied to appear before the destruction of the earth in Buddhist cosmology

== See also ==
- Central Fire, a fiery celestial body hypothesized by the pre-Socratic philosopher Philolaus to be positioned at the center of the universe, around which all other celestial objects revolve
- Religious cosmology, a way of explaining the origin, the history and the evolution of the cosmos or universe based on the religious mythology of a specific tradition
