= Mega-Earth =

Supermassive terrestrial planet

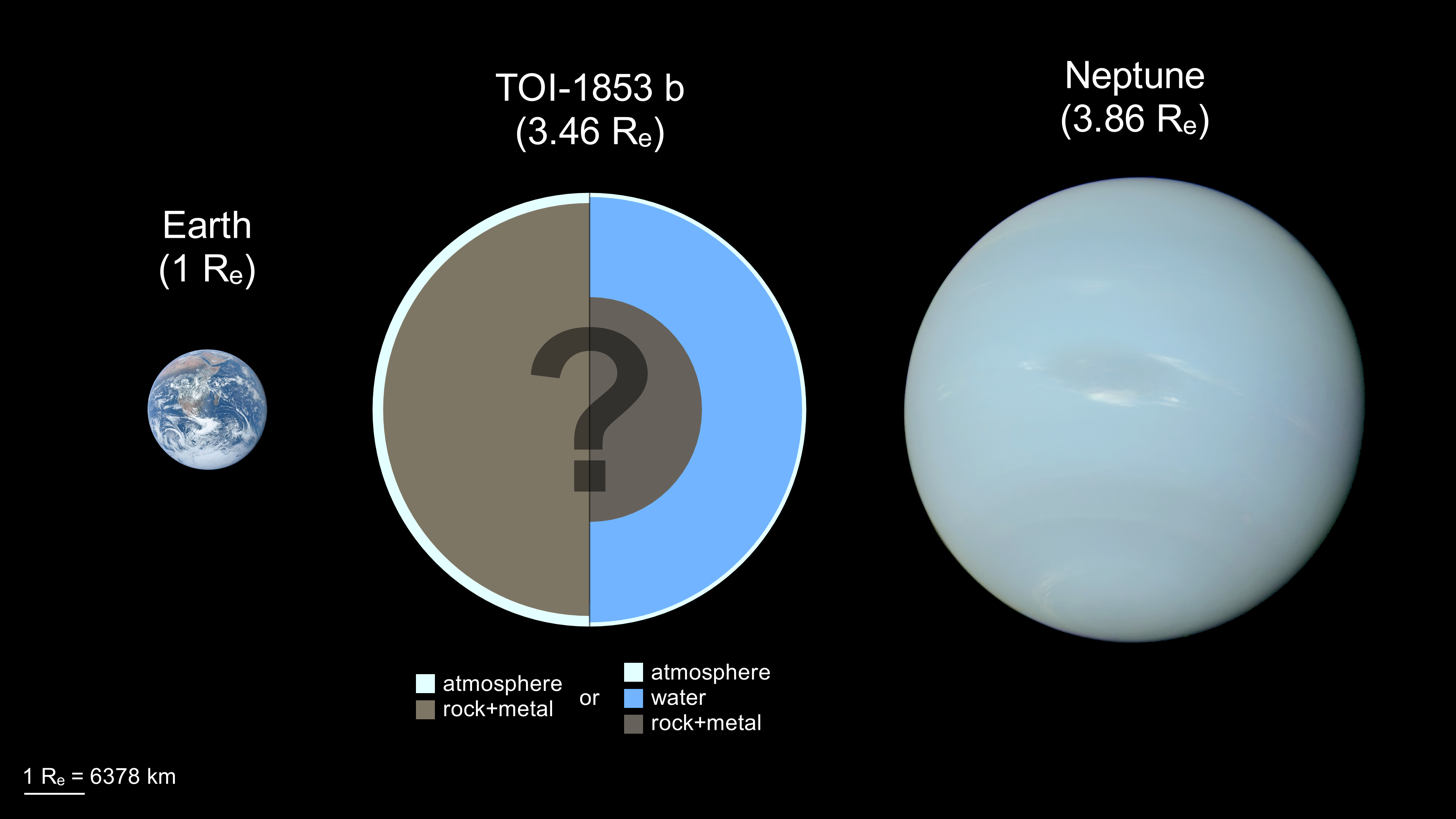
Size comparison of Earth and Neptune with the mega-Earth TOI-1853 b (center), a very dense Neptune-sized exoplanet believed to be nearly entirely made of solid rock, metal, and water.

A mega-Earth or massive solid planet is a type of terrestrial exoplanet that is very massive and dense—more massive than super-Earths. The term "mega-Earth" was coined in 2014, though it remained an informal category until a quantitative definition was proposed for it in 2026. Based on the measured radii and densities of known exoplanets as of March 2026, mega-Earths appear to be a distinct category of exoplanets that are between 2.1 and 5.0 Earth radii (R_{🜨}) and have densities higher than Earth's (5.5 g/cm^{3}).

Based on their observed high densities, mega-Earths are inferred to be largely made of solid material, such as rock, metal, and ice. If the mega-Earth is rich in volatiles like water, it may harbor a supercritical ocean under a thin atmosphere of hydrogen, helium, and other gases. The existence of mega-Earths challenges conventional theories for planetary formation, as massive planets should accrete large amounts of gas in addition to solid material from the host star's protoplanetary disk. It has been hypothesized that mega-Earths may either be remnant cores of evaporated gas giants or white dwarfs or products of consecutive collisions between super-Earths. Mega-Earths as evaporated gas giants have been theorized to occur frequently around luminous massive stars and supermassive black holes.

A 2026 study argued that mega-Earths likely do not actually exist; all detected mega-Earth candidates orbit active stars, suggesting that their apparent high masses are the result of false measurements caused by stellar activity.

== Examples ==
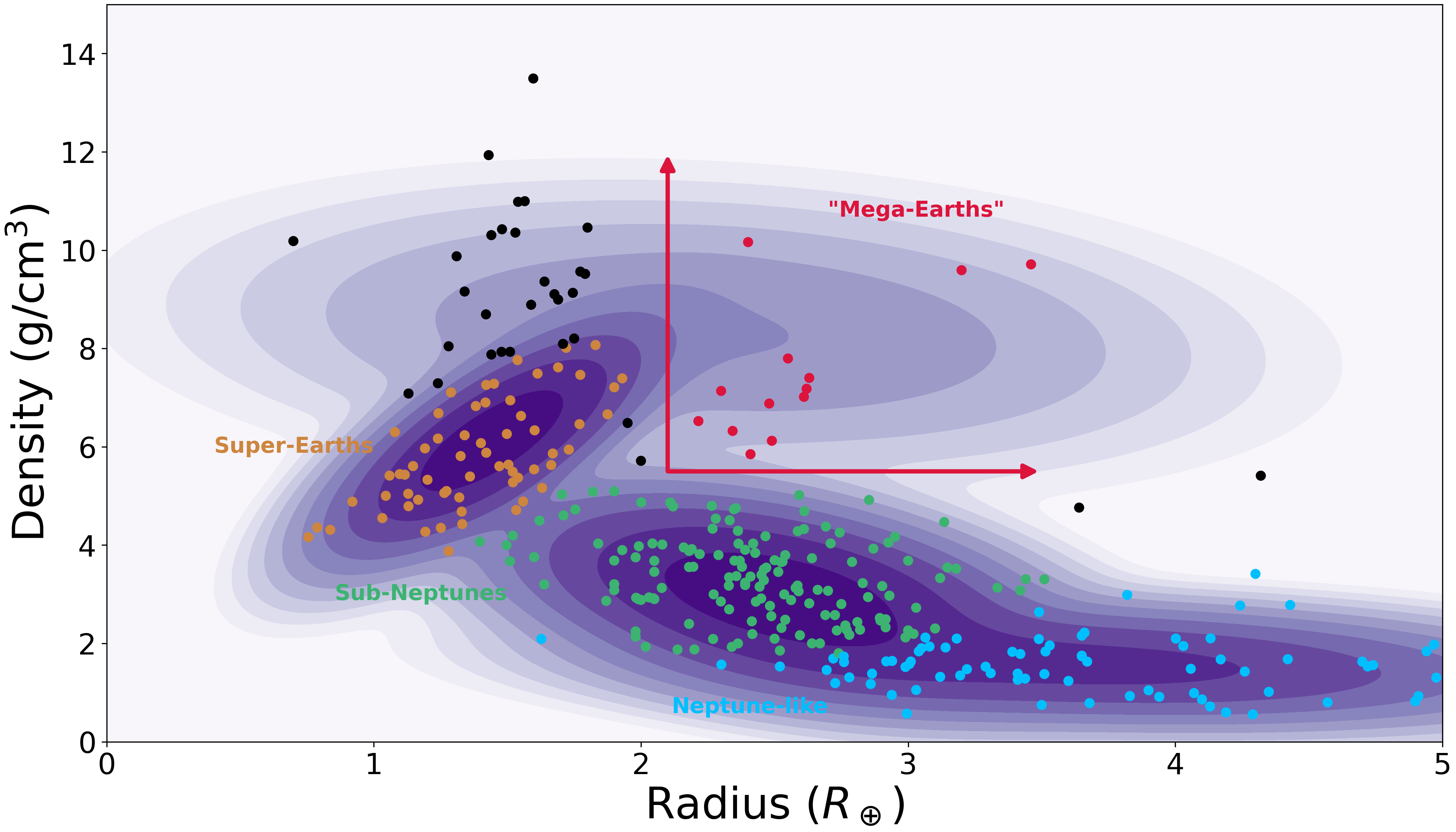
Scatter plot of measured radii and densities of known exoplanets as of March 2026. Mega-Earths (red points) have radii smaller than that of Neptune (2.1–5.0 R_{🜨}) and have densities higher than that of Earth (>5.5 g/cm^{3}).

Kepler-10c was the first exoplanet to be classified as a mega-Earth. At the time of its discovery, it was believed to have a mass around 17 times that of Earth (M_{🜨}) and a radius around 2.3 times Earth's (R_{🜨}), giving it a high density that implied a mainly rocky composition. However, several follow-up radial velocity studies produced different results for Kepler-10c's mass, all much below the original 17 M_{🜨} estimate. In 2017, a more careful analysis using data from multiple different telescopes and spectrographs found that Kepler-10c is more likely around 7.4 M_{🜨}, making it a typical volatile-rich mini-Neptune and not a mega-Earth.

K2-56b, also designated BD+20°594b, is a much more likely mega-Earth, with about 16 M_{🜨} and 2.2 R_{🜨}. At the time of its discovery in 2016, it had the highest chance of being rocky for a planet its size, with a posterior probability that it is dense enough to be terrestrial at about 0.43. For comparison, at the time the corresponding probability for Kepler-10c was calculated as 0.1, and as 0.002 for Kepler-131b.

Kepler-145b is one of the most massive planets classified as mega-Earths, with a mass of 37.1 M_{🜨} and a radius of 2.65 R_{🜨}, so large that it could belong to a sub-category of mega-Earths known as "supermassive terrestrial planets" (SMTP). It likely has an Earth-like composition of rock and iron without any volatiles. A similar mega-Earth, K2-66b, has a mass of about 21.3 M_{🜨} and a radius of about 2.49 R_{🜨}, and orbits a subgiant star. Its composition appears to be mainly rock with a small iron core and a relatively thin steam atmosphere.

Kepler-277b and Kepler-277c are a pair of planets orbiting the same star, both thought to be mega-Earths with masses of about 87.4 M_{🜨} and 64.2 M_{🜨}, and radii of about 2.92 R_{🜨} and 3.36 R_{🜨}, respectively.

PSR J1719−1438 b may be one of the most massive mega-Earths ever known, with a mass of about 330 M_{🜨} and a radius less than 4 R_{🜨}, slightly more massive but smaller than Jupiter. It is a pulsar planet which is most likely composed largely of crystalline carbon but with a density far greater than diamond. However, as it is a likely remnant core of a former white dwarf companion of PSR J1719−1438, it is instead considered an ultra-low-mass carbon white dwarf or object per some definitions.

A 2026 study defined a mega-Earth to be a planet with a radius between 2.1 and 5 Earth radii and a density greater than 5.5 g/cm^{3}, and listed 13 "confirmed" examples with well-measured radii and densities: K2-263 b, HD 88986 b, HD 207897 b, Kepler-538 b, HIP 97166 b, TOI-2093 c, GJ 143b, TOI-815 c, K2-292 b, GJ 523b, TOI-332 b, TOI-1853 b, and Kepler-411b. The 2.1 radius limit is chosen to be above the small planet radius gap that separates super-Earths from sub-Neptunes.

== Origin ==
The discovery of mega-Earths had challenged planetary formation theories. Formation mechanisms and the occurrence of such objects remain subjects of ongoing research and debate.

=== Around massive stars ===
A 2007 study had suggested the possibility of hypothetical solid planets up to thousands of M_{🜨} forming around massive stars (B-type and O-type stars; 5–120 M_{☉}). The hypothesis proposed that the protoplanetary disk around such stars would contain enough heavy elements, and that high UV radiation and strong winds could photoevaporate the gas in the disk, leaving just the heavy elements. For comparison, Neptune's mass equals 17 M_{🜨}, Jupiter has 318 M_{🜨}. The most massive of those objects were assumed to be up to approximately 4,000 M_{🜨} (or 13 M_{J}) per the said upper mass limit used in the IAU's working definition of an exoplanet. However, this limit has been debated due to no precise physical significance, with many exoplanet catalogs including objects with heavier masses, such as up to 60 M_{J}.

Despite the suggestion of the possibility of massive solid planets, it lacks supporting evidence for planetary formation theories and was primarily based on simulating mass-radius relationships for rocky planets, without investigating whether planetary formation theories support the existence of such objects. The 2007 study acknowledged that such massive exoplanets are not yet known to exist. More recent research has shown that the ratio of protoplanetary disk mass to stellar mass decreases rapidly for massive stars with initial masses above 10 M_{☉}, falling to less than 10^{−4}. Furthermore, no protoplanetary disks have been observed around O-type stars to date.

Given these considerations, the formation and existence of massive solid planets around massive stars remain speculative and require further research and observational evidence.

== See also ==
- Super-Neptune
