= Hypothetical black hole =

Hypothetical black hole may refer to:

- Micro black hole, a microscopic black hole proposed to have formed in the early universe
- Direct collapse black hole: a black hole formed from the collapse of hydrogen, rather than from a star
- Primordial black hole, a black hole that might have formed in a similar fashion to a star during the Universe's earliest epochs
- Extremal black hole, the smallest possible black hole that could exist while rotating at a specific speed
- White hole, the opposite of a black hole; a white hole continuously expels matter
