= Coreless planet =

Hypothetical planet with no metallic core

Formation of planetary cores going from left to right. The first two steps show the formation of a planet through dust particles condensing into asteroids which grow into planetasimals and then to protoplanets. Then as the protoplanet grows the interior heats up causing melting to occur. This melting allows heavier metals to sink to the center forming the core and volatiles to rise to the surface in a process called differentiation.

A coreless planet is a hypothetical type of terrestrial planet that has no metallic core and is thus effectively a giant rocky mantle. It can be formed in cooler regions and far from the star.

== Origin ==
According to a 2008 paper by Sara Seager and Linda Elkins-Tanton, there are probably two ways in which a coreless planet may form.

In the first, the planet accretes from chondrite-like fully oxidized water-rich material, where all the metallic iron is bound into silicate mineral crystals. Such planets may form in cooler regions farther from the central star.

In the second, the planet accretes from both water-rich and iron metal-rich material. However, the metal iron reacts with water to form iron oxide and release hydrogen before differentiation of a metal core has taken place. Provided the iron droplets are well mixed and small enough (<1 centimeter), the predicted end result is that the iron is oxidized and trapped in the mantle, unable to form a core.

== Magnetic field ==
Earth's magnetic field results from its flowing liquid metallic core, according to the dynamo theory, but in super-Earths the mass can produce high pressures with large viscosities and high melting temperatures which could prevent the interiors from separating into different layers and so result in undifferentiated coreless mantles. Magnesium oxide, which is rocky on Earth, can be liquid at the pressures and temperatures found in super-Earths and could generate a magnetic field in the mantles of super-Earths.

== Characteristics ==
The predicted sizes of coreless and cored planets are similar within a few percent, which makes it difficult to interpret the interior composition of exoplanets based on measured planetary masses and radii.

== See also ==
- Chthonian planet
