= Tidal circularization =

Effect of tidal forces on an orbiting body

Tidal circularization or orbital circularization is an effect of the tidal forces between a body in orbit around a central celestial object, whereby the eccentricity of the orbit is reduced over time so that it becomes less and less elliptical.

== Typical situation ==
Figure 1: Torque applied to orbit caused by tidal bulge and lag angle

In Figure 1, consider two stars, denoted Body 1 and Body 2. Initially think of Body 2 as a point mass. The gravity from Body 2 applied to Body 1 produces tidal bulges (see Tidal Force). Let's assume the orbital period is slower than the rotation of Body 1 (ω < Ω) as shown in figure 1. One might expect a lag angle as shown. If Body 1 is 100% elastic (e.g. gas bodies are usually very elastic but a bag of sand is not very elastic) then the bulge would not have a lag angle. The more inelastic, the larger the lag angle. The larger the difference in angular velocities (ω/Ω), the larger the lag angle. If ω > Ω, the lag angle will be in the other direction.

For a star we can think of inelasticity as viscosity. The main cause of inelasticity in a star seems to be convection forces inside the star. When the lag angle is non zero as in figure 1, the forces F1 and F2 combine to produce clockwise torque on body 1, because F1 is stronger. At the same time they torque the orbital motion counter clockwise: if you ignore the portion of F1 and F2 that lie along the line connecting the two bodies the remaining combined force on the entirety of body 1 is F3. Similarly F1’ and F2’ combine to produce F3’. F3 and F3’ torque the orbit counter clockwise. In this motion, the rotational momentum of the combined rotations is preserved.

This tells us that whenever angular velocity at a given moment of the orbit is less than the angular velocity of either body (ω<Ω) then the orbital torque tries to speed up the orbit.

Figure 2: Varying speeds of elliptical orbits

Now imagine two stars orbiting each other in elliptical orbits with the special case where both are tidally locked such that over the course of an orbit the same sides face each other (ω=Ω on average). Although Ω is constant for one orbit, ω varies throughout the orbit. Figure 2 shows the path of one of the stars where G is the center of gravity of the system. When the objects are near apoapsis (red region of figure 2), ω<Ω which tries to speed up the orbit. The result of this torque makes the far side of the orbit (periapsis) farther out making the orbit more circular. This follows from the rule of thumb "if thrust is applied briefly to speed up an orbit (i.e. applied along the direction of travel), then when the object orbits half way around, that part of the orbit will be higher" and vice versa: "retrograde thrust lowers the far side of an orbit" (see orbital rules of thumb).

When Body 1 is in the green region of Figure 2, the torque slows down the orbit. This is because F3 in figure 1 is now negative, because the lag angle is reversed. This lowers the far side of the orbit (lowers apoapsis). This effect reaches its maximum when Body 1 is closest to the center of gravity, because the tidal bulge is at its largest and ω/Ω is at maximum. Circularization takes place as a result of lowering apoapsis or raising periapsis.

== More complex situations ==
Circularization can also occur between two planets, or between a planet and a moon. At a larger scale, it can occur in clusters of stars orbiting an imaginary point in space at the center of gravity.

Orbital circularization can be caused by either or both of the two objects in an orbit if either or both are inelastic. Cooler stars tend to be more viscous and circularize objects orbiting them faster than hot stars.

If Ω/ω > 18/11 (~1.64) circularization will not occur and the eccentricity will increase. In order for circularization to take place, the bodies first need to become tidally locked, in which at least one object has the same side facing the other object during the course of an orbit.

== See also ==
- Tidal locking
- Tidal acceleration
- Kozai mechanism, opposite effect
