= Chthonian planet =

Gas giants with their atmospheric layers stripped

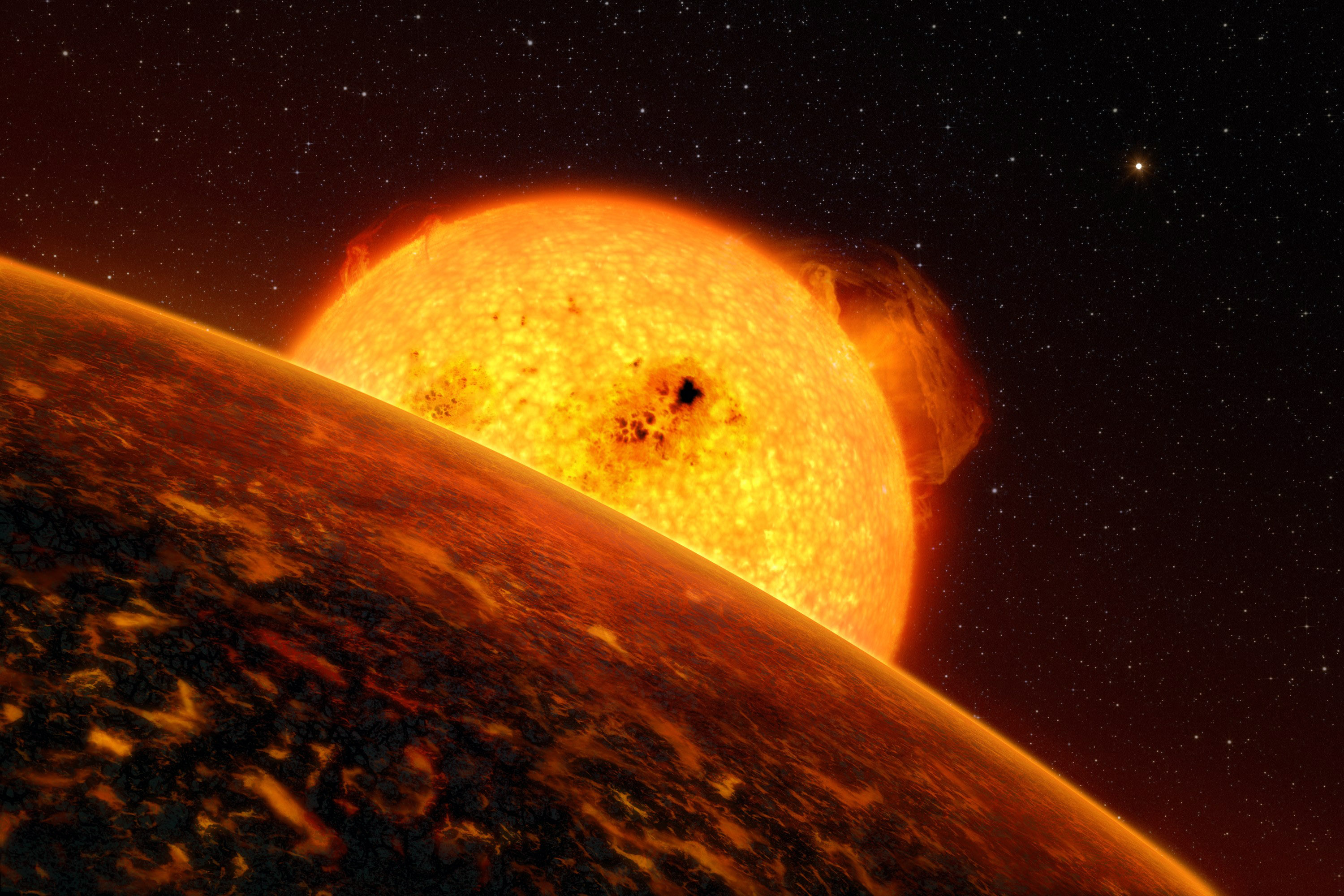
Artist's conception of CoRoT-7b.

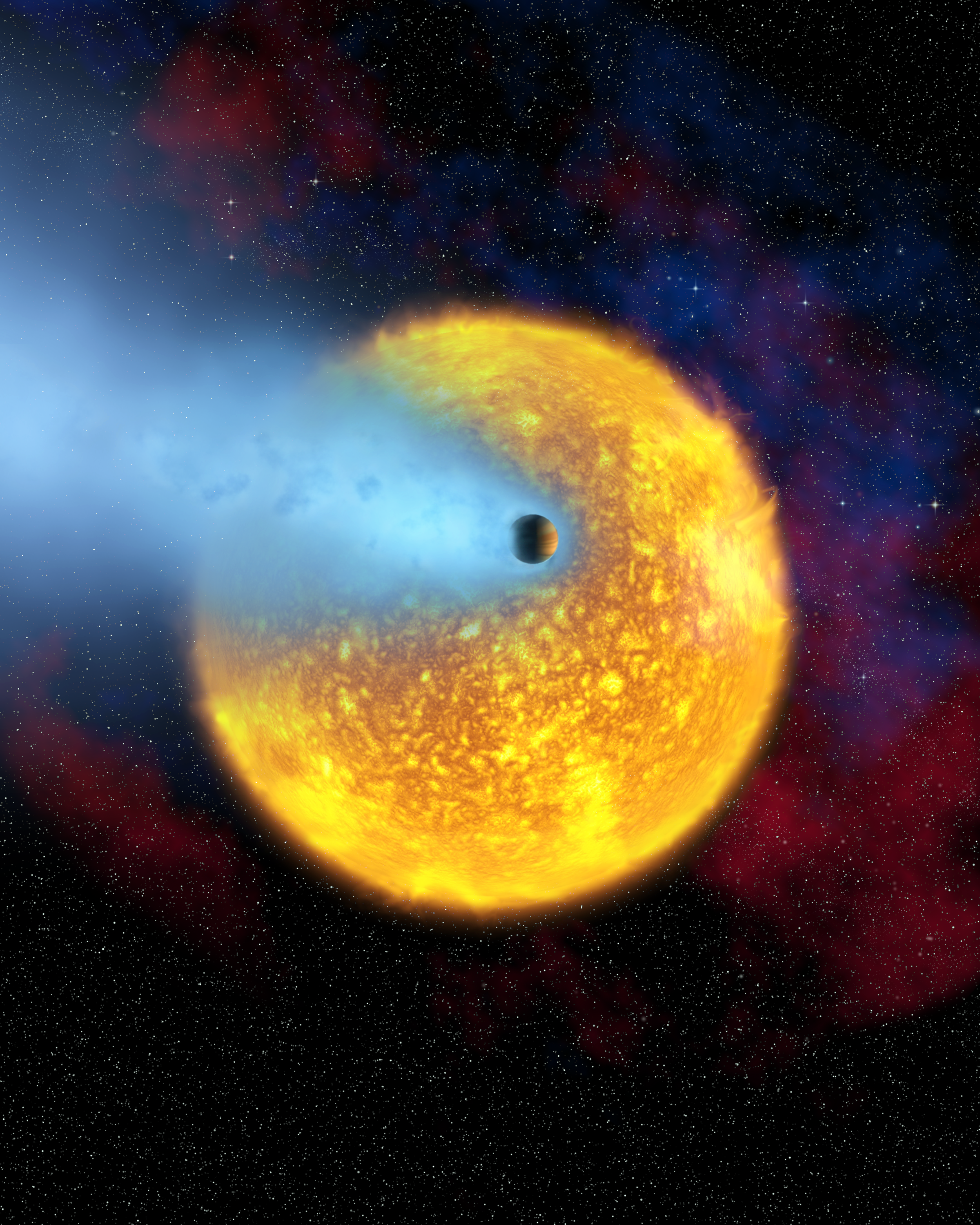
Artist's conception of HD 209458 b transiting its star.

Chthonian planets (/ˈkθoʊniən/, sometimes 'cthonian') are a hypothetical class of celestial objects resulting from the stripping away of a gas giant's hydrogen and helium atmosphere and outer layers, which is called hydrodynamic escape. Such atmospheric stripping is a likely result of proximity to a star. The remaining rocky or metallic core would resemble a terrestrial planet in many respects.

== Etymology ==
Chthon (from Greek: Χθών) means "earth". The term chthonian was coined by Guillaume Hébrard et al. and generally refers to Greek chthonic deities from the infernal underground.

== Possible examples ==
Transit-timing variation measurements indicate, for example, that Kepler-52b, Kepler-52c and Kepler-57b have maximum masses between 30 and 100 times the mass of Earth (although the actual masses could be much lower); with radii about two Earth radii, they might have densities greater than that of an iron planet of the same size. These exoplanets orbit very close to their stars and could be the remnant cores of evaporated gas giants or brown dwarfs. If cores are massive enough they could remain compressed for billions of years despite losing the atmospheric mass.

As there is a lack of gaseous "hot-super-Earths" between 2.2 and 3.8 Earth-radii exposed to over 650 Earth incident flux, it is assumed that exoplanets below such radii exposed to such stellar fluxes could have had their envelopes stripped by photoevaporation.

=== HD 209458 b ===
HD 209458 b is an example of a gas giant that is in the process of having its atmosphere stripped away, though it will not become a chthonian planet for many billions of years, if ever. A similar case would be Gliese 436 b, which has already lost 10% of its atmosphere.

=== CoRoT-7b ===
CoRoT-7b is the first exoplanet found that might be chthonian. Other researchers dispute this, and conclude CoRoT-7b was always a rocky planet and not the eroded core of a gas or ice giant, due to the young age of the star system.

=== TOI-849 b ===
In 2020, a high-density planet more massive than Neptune was found very close to its host star, within the Neptunian desert. This world, TOI-849 b, may very well be a chthonian planet.

== See also ==
- Black dwarf
- Catastrophically evaporating planet
- CoRoT-7b
- Hot Jupiter
- Pulsar planet
- Hypothetical astronomical object
- Kepler-70
- KELT-9b
- Mini-Neptune
- Super-Earth
- TOI-1853 b
