= Gas giant =

Giant planet mostly made of light elements

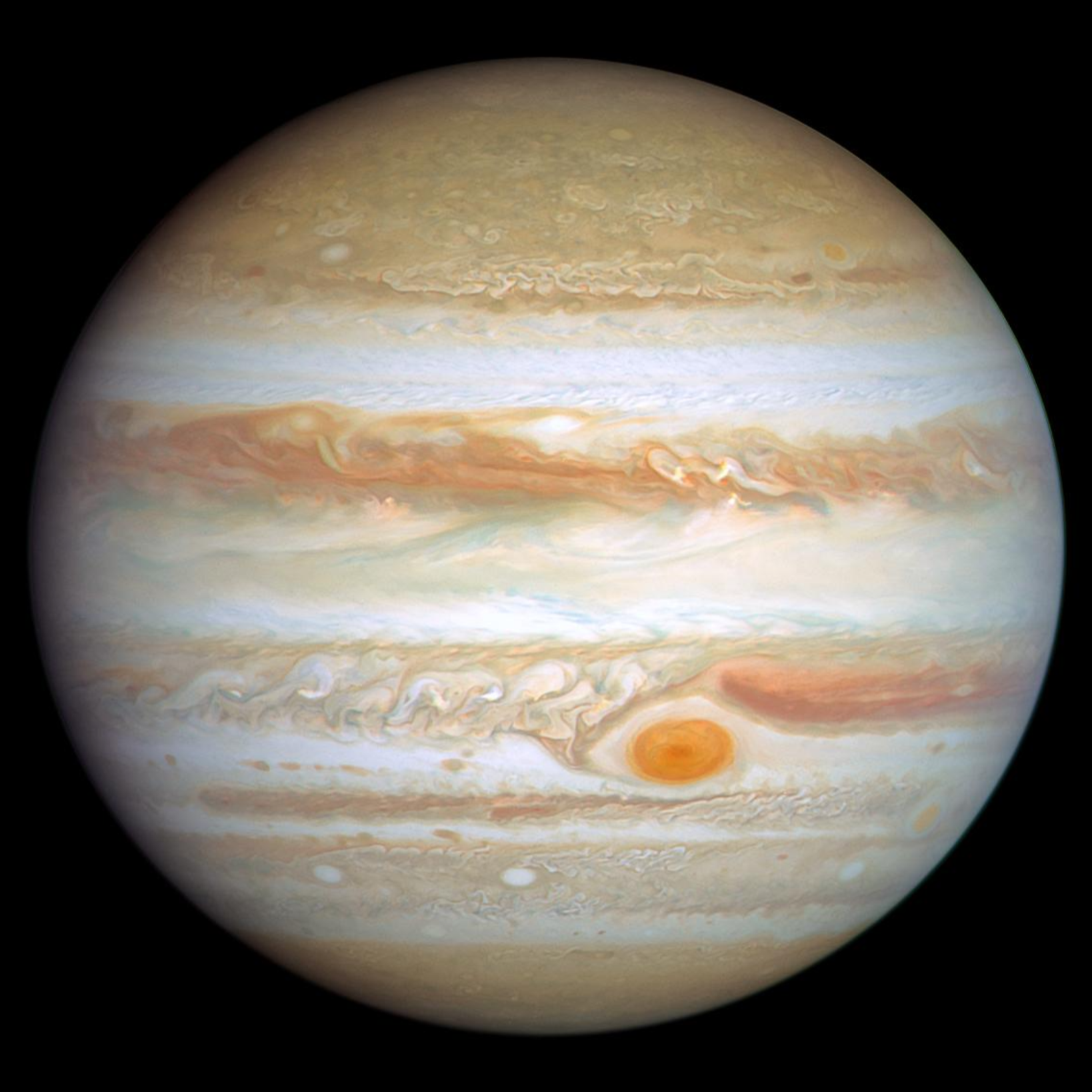
Jupiter photographed by the Hubble Space Telescope in January 2024

Saturn photographed by Cassini in July 2008

A gas giant is a giant planet composed mainly of hydrogen and helium. There are two gas giants in the Solar System: Jupiter and Saturn. The term "gas giant" was originally synonymous with "giant planet". However, starting in the 1970s and continuing into the 1980s, it became increasingly common to classify Uranus and Neptune separately as ice giants, a distinct class of giant planets composed mainly of heavier volatile substances (referred to as "ices").

Jupiter and Saturn consist mostly of hydrogen and helium, with heavier elements making up between 3 and 13 percent of their mass. They are thought to have a deep atmosphere of molecular hydrogen, with lower layers being more compressed, surrounding a layer of liquid metallic hydrogen, and with a molten rocky core inside. The outermost portions of their hydrogen atmospheres contain many layers of visible clouds that are mostly composed of water and ammonia. The layer of metallic hydrogen located in the mid-interior would make up the bulk of the mass of every gas giant, and it is referred to as "metallic" because under the immense weight of the atmosphere, the very high pressure turns hydrogen into an electrical conductor. The gas giants' cores are thought to consist of heavier elements at such high temperatures (20,000 K [19,700 °C; 35,500 °F]) and pressures that their properties are not yet completely understood. The placement of the solar system's gas giants can be explained by the grand tack hypothesis.

The line of delineation between very low-mass brown dwarf stars (which can have masses as low as 13 times that of Jupiter) and gas giants is debated. While one definition depends on the manner of formation of the object, the other relies only on the physics of the interior. Part of the debate concerns whether brown dwarfs must by definition have experienced nuclear fusion at some point in their history.

== Terminology ==
Gas giants lack a defined surface; the atmosphere becomes progressively denser closer to the core.

The term gas giant was coined in 1952 by the science fiction writer James Blish and was originally used to refer to all giant planets. It is, arguably, something of a misnomer because throughout most of the volume of all giant planets, the pressure is so high that matter is not in gaseous form. Other than solids in the core and the upper layers of the atmosphere, all matter is above the critical point, where there is no distinction between liquids and gases. The term has nevertheless caught on, because planetary scientists typically use "rock", "gas", and "ice" as shorthands for classes of elements and compounds commonly found as planetary constituents, irrespective of what phase the matter may appear in. In the outer Solar System, hydrogen and helium are referred to as "gases"; water, methane, and ammonia as "ices"; and silicates and metals as "rocks". In this terminology, since Uranus and Neptune are primarily composed of ices, not gas, they are more commonly called ice giants and distinct from the gas giants.

== Classification ==
Theoretically, gas giants can be divided into five distinct classes according to their modeled physical atmospheric properties, and hence their appearance: ammonia clouds (I), water clouds (II), cloudless (III), alkali-metal clouds (IV), and silicate clouds (V). Jupiter and Saturn are both class I. Hot Jupiters are class IV or V.

== Extrasolar ==
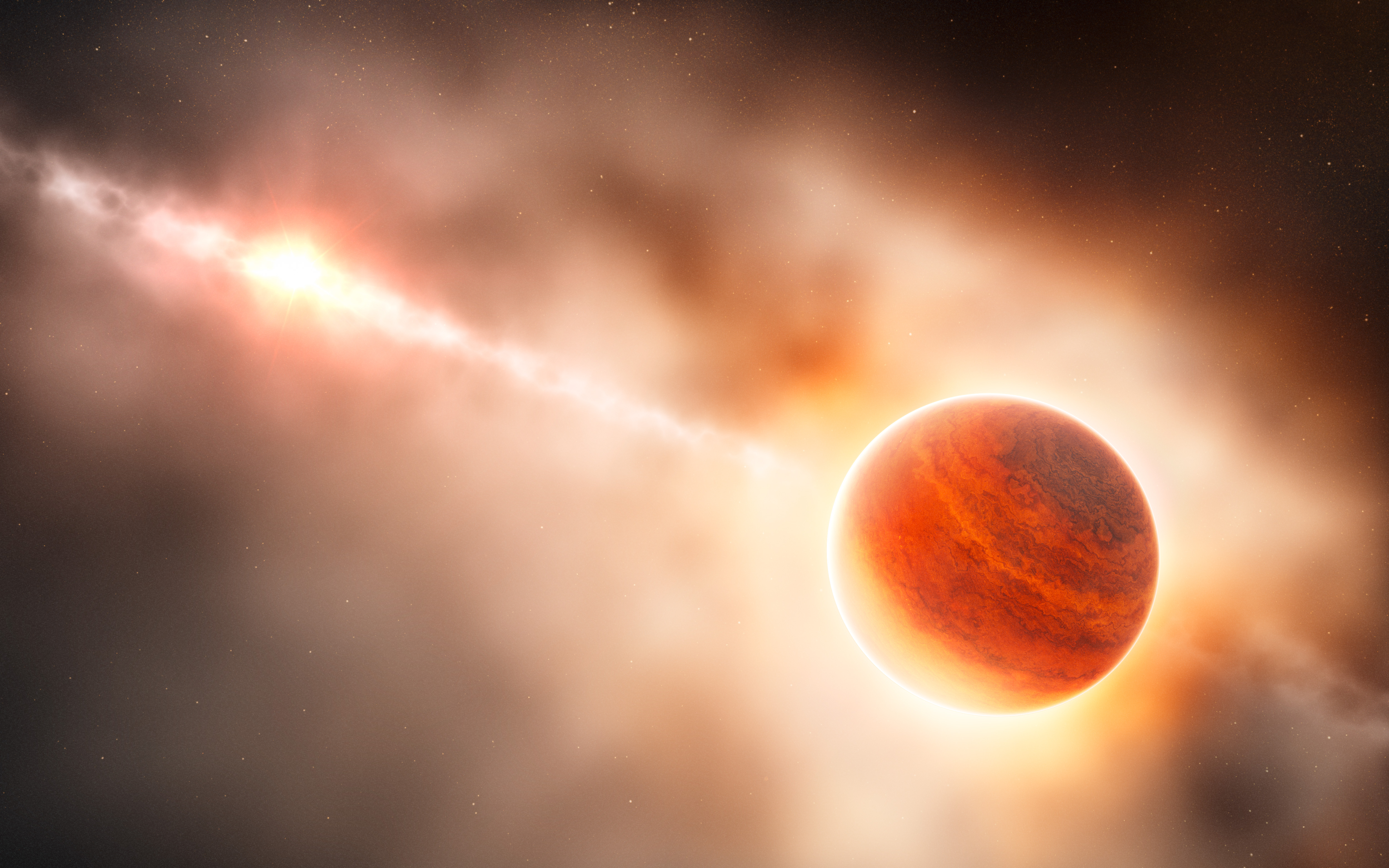
Artist's impression of the formation of a gas giant around the star HD 100546

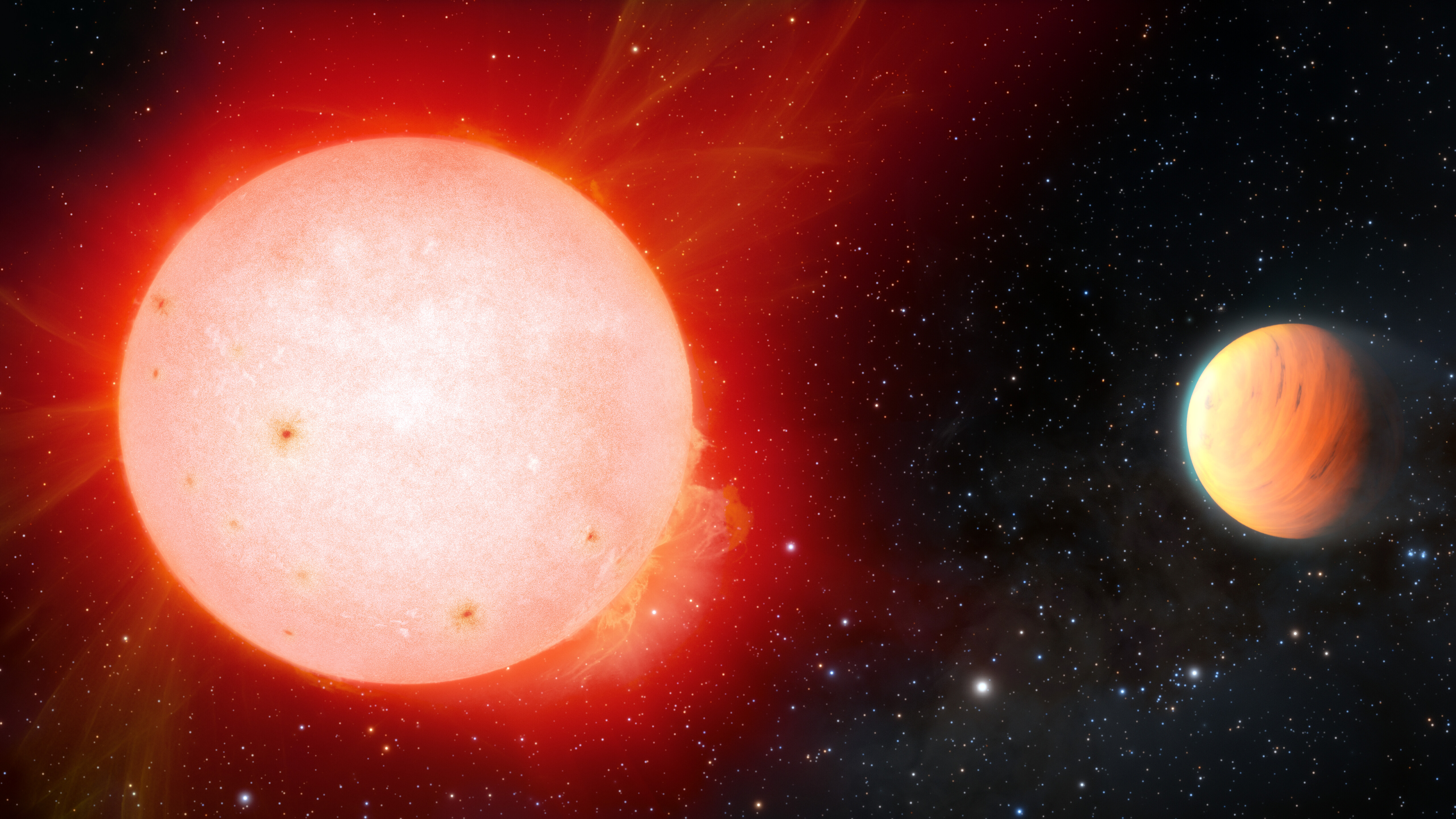
A gas giant exoplanet [right] with the density of a marshmallow has been detected in orbit around a cool red dwarf star [left] by the NASA-funded NEID radial-velocity instrument on the 3.5-meter WIYN Telescope at Kitt Peak National Observatory.

=== Cold gas giants ===
A cold hydrogen-rich gas giant more massive than Jupiter but less than about 500 M_{🜨} (1.6 M_{J}) will only be slightly larger in volume than Jupiter. For masses above 500 M_{🜨}, gravity will cause the planet to shrink (see degenerate matter).

Kelvin–Helmholtz heating can cause a gas giant to radiate more energy than it receives from its host star.

=== Gas dwarfs ===
Although the words "gas" and "giant" are often combined, hydrogen planets need not be as large as the familiar gas giants from the Solar System. However, smaller gas planets and planets closer to their star will lose atmospheric mass more quickly via hydrodynamic escape than larger planets and planets farther out.

A gas dwarf could be defined as a planet with a rocky core that has accumulated a thick envelope of hydrogen, helium and other volatiles, having as result a total radius between 1.7 and 3.9 Earth-radii.

The smallest known extrasolar planet that is likely a "gas planet" is Kepler-138d, which has the same mass as Earth but is 60% larger and therefore has a density that indicates a thick gas envelope.

A low-mass gas planet can still have a radius resembling that of a gas giant if it has the right temperature.

== Precipitation and meteorological phenomena ==
=== Jovian weather ===
Heat funneled upward by local storms is a major driver of the weather on gas giants. Much, if not all, of the deep heat escaping the interior flows up through towering thunderstorms. These disturbances develop into small eddies that eventually form storms such as the Great Red Spot on Jupiter. On Earth and Jupiter, lightning and the hydrologic cycle are intimately linked together to create intense thunderstorms. During a terrestrial thunderstorm, condensation releases heat that pushes rising air upward. This "moist convection" engine can segregate electrical charges into different parts of a cloud; the reuniting of those charges is lightning. Therefore, we can use lightning to signal to us where convection is happening. Although Jupiter has no ocean or wet ground, moist convection seems to function similarly compared to Earth.

=== Jupiter's Red Spot ===
The Great Red Spot (GRS) is a high-pressure system located in Jupiter's southern hemisphere. The GRS is a powerful anticyclone, swirling at about 430 to 680 kilometers per hour counterclockwise around the center. The Spot has become known for its ferocity, even feeding on smaller Jovian storms.

=== Helium rain on Saturn and Jupiter ===
Condensation of helium creates liquid helium rain on gas giants. On Saturn, this helium condensation occurs at certain pressures and temperatures when helium does not mix in with the liquid metallic hydrogen present on the planet. Regions on Saturn where helium is insoluble allow the denser helium to form droplets and act as a source of energy, both through the release of latent heat and by descending deeper into the center of the planet. This phase separation leads to helium droplets that fall as rain through the liquid metallic hydrogen until they reach a warmer region where they dissolve in the hydrogen. Since Jupiter and Saturn have different total masses, the thermodynamic conditions in the planetary interior could be such that this condensation process is more prevalent in Saturn than in Jupiter. Helium condensation could be responsible for Saturn's excess luminosity as well as the helium depletion in the atmosphere of both Jupiter and Saturn.

== See also ==
- List of gravitationally rounded objects of the Solar System
- List of planet types – Types of planet by chemical mass
- Hot Jupiter – Gas giant planet orbiting close to a star
- Ice giant – Type of giant planet
- Kepler-1704b – Eccentric super-Jupiter orbiting Kepler-1704
- Brown dwarf – Substellar object
