= GJ 4256 b =

Earth-sized exoplanet falling into a star

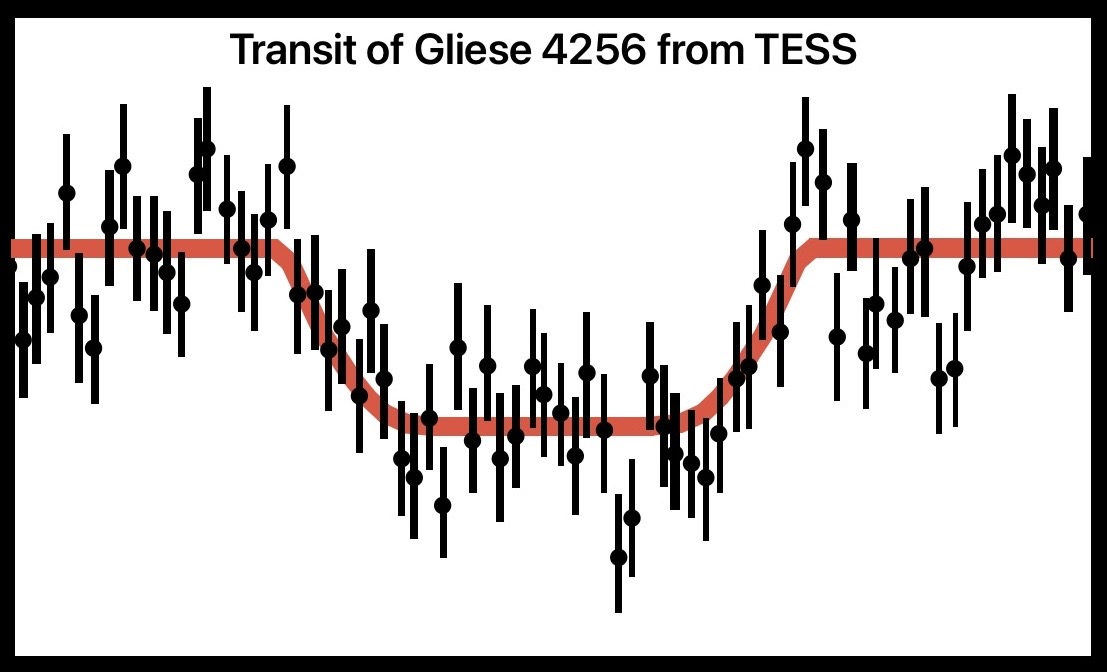
- The transit of GJ 4256 observed by the Transiting Exoplanet Survey Satellite (TESS)

Discovery
- Discovery date: 2024
- Detection method: Transit

Designations
- Alternative names: Gliese 4256, TOI-6255 b, TOI-6255.01

Orbital characteristics
- Semi-major axis: 0.0054
- Eccentricity: 0.0
- Orbital period (sidereal): 0.23818244 d
- Inclination: 74.4
- Star: GJ 4256

Physical characteristics
- Mean radius: 1.079 ±0.065 R_{🜨}
- Mass: 1.44 ±0.14 M_{🜨}
- Temperature: 1300 K

GJ 4256 b (also known as TOI-6255 b) is an Earth-size terrestrial exoplanet located around 66.21 light years (20.3 parsecs) from Earth orbiting the red dwarf star GJ 4256. The planet has a mass of 1.44 ±0.14 Earths and a radius of 1.079 ±0.065 Earths. lt orbits extremely close to its parent star at a distance of 0.0054 AU. This makes GJ 4256 classed as an ultra-short period (USP) planet with an orbital period of just 0.23 days. The close distance of this planet places significant tidal deformation on the planet. This makes GJ 4256 b appear similar in shape to an egg and making it one of the most tidally distorted terrestrial planets discovered so far. It also means that GJ 4256 b also has a magma ocean making it a lava planet with a temperature of 1300 Kelvin.

The planet may be a favorable target for the study of magnetic interactions between the star and its planets which may cause interior melting and quicken orbital decay. GJ 4256 is a top target for phase-curve observations by the James Webb Space Telescope (JWST).

== Discovery ==
GJ 4256 b was discovered in 2024 using the transit method. The star was observed in September 2019 and 2022 using the Transiting Exoplanet Survey Satellite (TESS). It was also observed with the CARMENES instrument at the Calar Alto Observatory. If GJ 4156 had a companion star, that star could have produced false-positive transit signals. To remove the possibility of false-positives, the star was observed to look for any companion stars with Palomar/PHARO. There were no companion stars found.

After the detection of GJ 4256 b, there was a search for additional planets in the systems. A transit signal was uncovered designated TOI-6255.02. If it were a planet, it would have an orbit of 14.48 days. This signal was also reported on the ExoFOP website by a citizen scientist named Alton Spencer. However due to a lack of additional prominent signals and a substantial flux occurring in a nearby background star, the TOI-6255.02 signal was likely a false-positive.

== Physical characteristics ==
The first is a two-layer interior model with an iron core that is surrounded by a silicate mantle. This would make the iron core mass fraction (CMF) be 0.45 ±0.32. The second is the SUPEREARTH model which is able to distinguish between the true iron mass fraction (Fe-CMF of 0.38 ± 0.15) which may be due to the silicate mantle containing iron while the iron core containing other elements. Results show that the simpler two-layered model seems to be more accurate.

The planet magnetically interacts with its star that is analogous to the interaction between Jupiter and one of its moons Io.

=== Tidal deformation ===
The planet orbits so close to the host star that it has nearly passed the roche limit. The expected tidal forces caused by the star would likely have deformed the planet pulling it into an triaxial ellipsoid (egg-like shape) with its long axis that is ~10% longer than the short axis. It is possible that the tidal distortion may be significantly greater than what Love theory predicts with the long axis being 15% longer than the short axis.

It experiences tidal orbital decay and it is predicted that in around 400 million years, the planet will have passed the roche limit of parent star and be ripped apart and engulfed by the star. GJ 4256 is likely not in the process of disintegrating (see: catastrophically evaporating planets). Examples of disintegrating planets, all of which have orbital periods that are greater than GJ 4256, include KOI-2700 b, KIC 12557548 b, K2-22b and BD+05 4868Ab. Evidence for disintegration would be asymmetries in the transit data and debris material up to a kilometer in size would be detectable. However no evidence for disintegration has been observed.
