= List of smallest exoplanets =

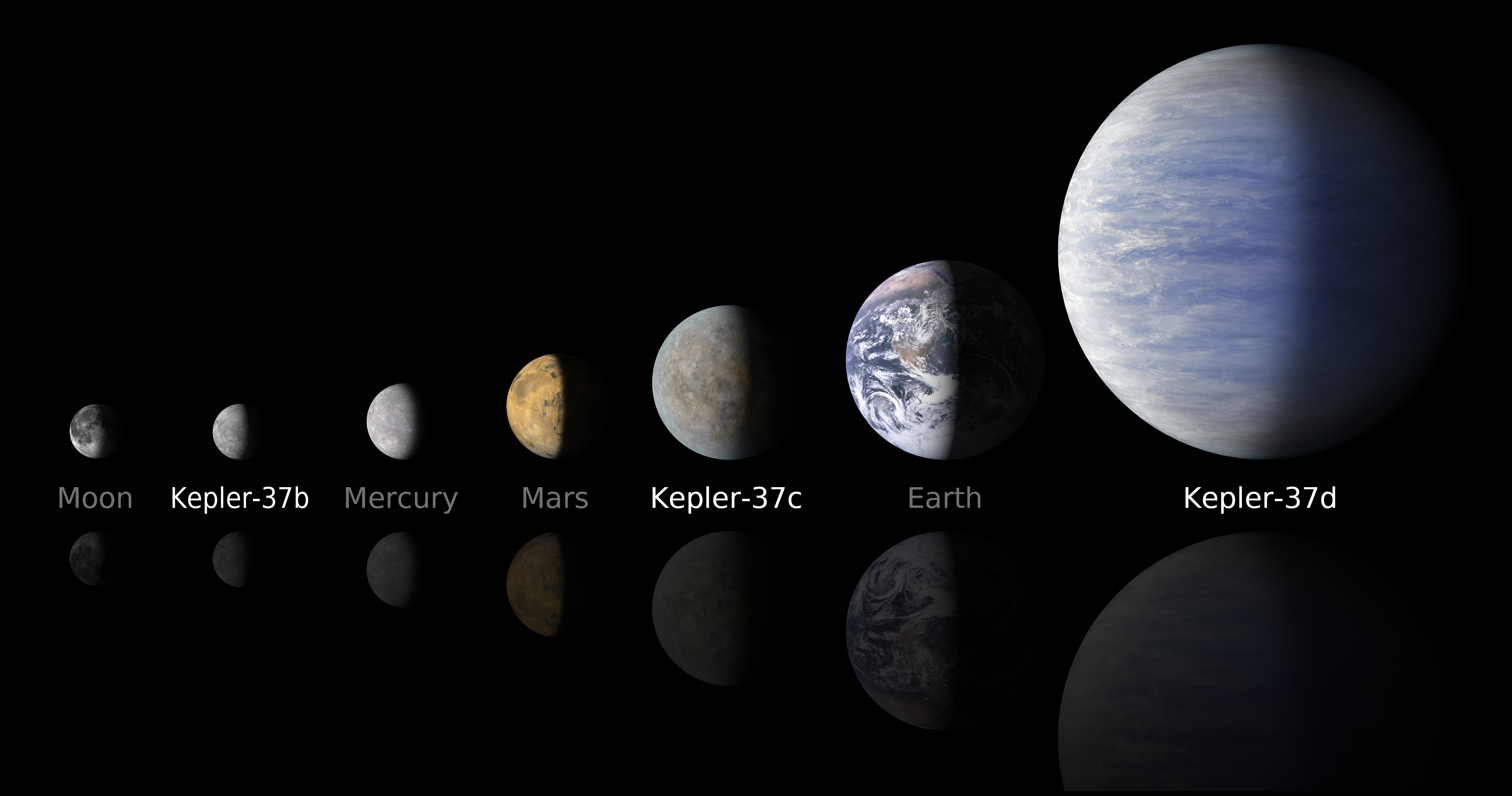
A size comparison of the planets in the Kepler-37 system and objects in the Solar System

Below is a list of the smallest exoplanets so far discovered, in terms of physical size, ordered by radius.

== List ==
The sizes are listed in units of Earth radii (R_{🜨}). All planets listed are smaller than Earth and up to 1 Earth radii. The NASA Exoplanet Archive is used as the main data source. Radii listed in italics are estimates.

Exoplanet	Radius (R_{🜨})	Notes and references	Mass (M_{🜨})
SDSS J0845+2257 b	0.01-0.013	Planetesimal, enhanced in iron and silicates.	
WD 1145+017 b	~0.03	Disintegrating planetesimal, likely one of several orbiting its star. Likely about one-tenth the mass of Ceres and ~200 km in radius.	~0.000016
Ceres	0.0742	Shown for comparison	
Pluto	0.1863	Shown for comparison	
Moon	0.2725	Shown for comparison	
Kepler-37b	0.3098+0.0059 −0.0076	Smallest known exoplanet.	<0.79
BD+05 4868 Ab	~0.314	Disintegrating planet, radius is just an estimate.	0.02
PSR B1257+12 b (Draugr)	~0.338	Least massive known exoplanet, at 0.02 Earth masses. Radius predicted from mass-radius relationship.	0.02
Kepler-1520b	≲0.36	Disintegrating planets with poorly known radii, all thought to be smaller than Mercury.	
KOI-2700b	≲0.36	Disintegrating planets with poorly known radii, all thought to be smaller than Mercury.	
K2-22b	≲0.36	Disintegrating planets with poorly known radii, all thought to be smaller than Mercury.	
Mercury	0.3826	Shown for comparison	
Kepler-879c	0.4±0.1		
Kepler-444b	0.403+0.016 −0.014		
Ganymede	0.413	Shown for comparison	
Kepler-158d	0.43±0.05		
Kepler-102b	0.460±0.026		
Kepler-444c	0.497+0.021 −0.017		
Kepler-1971b (KOI-4777.01)	0.51±0.03		
Kepler-1489c	0.51±0.08		
Kepler-1994b	0.51+0.06 −0.05		
Kepler-1308b	0.52+0.06 −0.05		
Kepler-444d	0.530+0.022 −0.019		
Mars	0.5325	Shown for comparison	
Kepler-62c	0.54±0.03		
Kepler-444e	0.546+0.017 −0.015		
Gliese 238 b	0.566±0.014		
Kepler-102c	0.567±0.028		
Kepler-42d	0.57±0.18		
Kepler-1583b	0.60+0.09 −0.05		
Kepler-1998b	0.6+0.08 −0.04		
Kepler-963c	0.6±0.2		
Kepler-974c (KOI-1843.03)	0.61+0.12 −0.08	Candidate. As of 2025, the Exoplanet Archive lists it as confirmed.	
Kepler-1087b	0.61+0.17 −0.05		
K2-89b	0.615±0.080		
Kepler-1877b	0.624		
Barnard's Star e	~0.637	Radius predicted from mass-radius relationship. Least massive exoplanet detected by radial velocity and possibly smallest known within 10 parsecs.	
K2-137b	0.64±0.10	The discovery paper finds a larger radius of 0.89±0.09 R_{🜨}	
Kepler-1371c	0.64+0.07 −0.05		
Kepler-138b	0.64±0.02		
Kepler-1130d	0.645		
Kepler-1351b	0.65+0.05 −0.04		
Kepler-1542c	0.65+0.09 −0.06		
Kepler-271d	0.66±0.05		
Kepler-431c	0.668		
Kepler-1558b	0.68+0.06 −0.04		
LHS 1678 b	0.685+0.037 −0.035		
K2-116b	0.69±0.04		
Kepler-141b	0.69±0.05		
K2-297b (EPIC 201497682 b)	0.692+0.059 −0.048		
Proxima Centauri d	~0.692	Radius predicted from mass-radius relationship.	
Barnard's Star d	~0.694	Radius predicted from mass-radius relationship.	
Gliese 367 b (Tahay)	0.699±0.024	Smallest exoplanet within 10 parsecs with a measured radius.	0.633
Kepler-2003b (KOI-4978.02)	0.7±0.1		
Kepler-378c	0.70±0.05		

=== Excluded objects ===
Kepler-37e is listed with a radius of 0.37±0.18 R_{🜨} in the Exoplanet Archive based on KOI data, but the existence of this planet is doubtful, and assuming its existence, a 2023 study found a mass of 8.1±1.7 M_{🜨}, inconsistent with such a small radius.

KOI-6705.01, listed as a potential very small planet in the KOI dataset, was shown to be a false positive in 2016.

== Candidate planets ==
Below is a list of candidate planets below 0.7 R_{🜨}. These planets have yet to be confirmed.

Kepler object of interest	Radius (R_{🜨})	Notes and references
SDSS J1228+1040 b (SDSS J122859.92+104033.0 b, WD 1226+110 b)	0.010^{+0.0504}_{−0.0085}	Extrasolar planetesimal. Likely a remnant iron core. Radius is in the range of 1.2 – 120 km. Has been disputed in a 2023 publication.
TRAPPIST-1i	0.228+0.025 −0.032	
KOI-4582.01	0.35	
KOI-2298.03	0.36	
KOI-2169.04	0.37	
KOI-7174.01	0.37	
KOI-8012.01	0.42	
KOI-6860.01	0.43	
KOI-2059.02	0.44	
KOI-304.02	0.46	
KOI-7793.01	0.46	
KOI-2678.02	0.48	
KOI-6631.01	0.48	
KOI-2421.02	0.48	
KOI-5974.01	0.49	
KOI-3444.03	0.5	
KOI-2295.01	0.52	
KOI-7863.01	0.52	
KOI-2612.02	0.53	
KOI-4657.01	0.54	
KOI-8257.01	0.54	
KOI-115.03 (Kepler-105d)	0.55+0.08 −0.07	
KOI-2421.01	0.55	
KOI-4097.02	0.55	
KOI-7645.01	0.55	
KOI-3208.01	0.56	
KOI-6763.01	0.56	
KOI-2859.03	0.57	
KOI-4146.02	0.57	
KOI-2859.04	0.57	
KOI-7873.01	0.57	
TOI-4307.02	0.57±0.14	
KOI-2657.01	0.58	
KOI-8277.01	0.58	
KOI-4296.01	0.59	
KOI-3196.01	0.59	
KOI-5692.01	0.59	
KOI-1964.01	0.6	
KOI-4407.01	0.6	
KOI-4871.01	0.6	
KOI-5211.01	0.6	
KOI-7888.01	0.6	
KOI-3184.03	0.6	
KOI-8183.01	0.6	
KOI-3083.02	0.61	
KOI-4421.01	0.61	
KOI-4716.01	0.61	
KOI-3102.01	0.61	
KOI-7032.01	0.61	
KOI-1499.02	0.62	
KOI-605.02	0.62	
KOI-7676.01	0.62	
KOI-4849.01	0.62	
KOI-365.02	0.62	
KOI-7116.01	0.62	
KOI-4421.02	0.62	
KOI-7949.01	0.62	
KOI-2029.04	0.63	
KOI-6889.01	0.63	
KOI-2636.02	0.63	
KOI-3248.01	0.64	
KOI-5213.01	0.64	
KOI-6276.01	0.64	
KOI-7617.01	0.64	
KOI-7903.01	0.64	
KOI-7925.01	0.64	
KOI-8174.01	0.64	
KOI-3083.03	0.65	
KOI-4875.01	0.65	
KOI-4808.01	0.65	
KOI-6568.01	0.65	
KOI-1619.01	0.66	
KOI-3111.02	0.66	
KOI-2859.05	0.66	
KOI-3017.01	0.67	
KOI-4907.01	0.67	
KOI-1616.02	0.67	
KOI-6299.01	0.67	
KOI-8211.01	0.67	
KOI-2593.02	0.68	
KOI-4605.01	0.68	
KOI-7832.01	0.68	
KOI-7483.01	0.68	
KOI-2623.02	0.68	
KOI-7924.01	0.68	
KOI-7628.01	0.69	
KOI-4129.01	0.69	
KOI-4822.01	0.69	
KOI-6600.01	0.69	

== See also ==
- List of largest exoplanets
- List of exoplanet extremes
- Lists of exoplanets
