= Volcanism =

Phenomenon where interior material reaches the surface of an astronomical body

Volcanism, vulcanism, volcanicity, or volcanic activity is the phenomenon where solids, liquids, gases, and their mixtures erupt to the surface of a solid-surface astronomical body such as a planet or a moon. It is caused by the presence of a heat source, usually internally generated, inside the body; the heat is generated by various processes, such as radioactive decay or tidal heating. This heat partially melts solid material in the body or turns material into gas. The mobilized material rises through the body's interior and may break through the solid surface.

== Causes ==
Cross section diagram of Earth showing some settings for volcanism on the planet

For volcanism to occur, the temperature of the mantle must have risen to about half its melting point. At this point, the mantle's viscosity will have dropped to about 10^{21} Pascal-seconds. When large scale melting occurs, the viscosity rapidly falls to 10^{3} Pascal-seconds or even less, increasing the heat transport rate a million-fold.

The occurrence of volcanism is partially due to the fact that melted material tends to be more mobile and less dense than the materials from which they were produced, which can cause it to rise to the surface.

=== Heat source ===
There are multiple ways to generate the heat needed for volcanism. Volcanism on outer solar system moons is powered mainly by tidal heating. Tidal heating is caused by the deformation of a body's shape due to mutual gravitational attraction, which generates heat. Tidal heating is the cause of volcanism on Io, a moon of Jupiter. Earth experiences tidal heating from the Moon, deforming by up to 1 metre (3 feet), but this does not make up a major portion of Earth's total heat.

During a planet's formation, it would have experienced heating from impacts from planetesimals, which would have dwarfed even the asteroid impact that caused the extinction of dinosaurs. This heating could trigger differentiation, further heating the planet. The larger a body is, the slower it loses heat. In larger bodies, for example Earth, this heat, known as primordial heat, still makes up much of the body's internal heat, but the Moon, which is smaller than Earth, has lost most of this heat.

Another heat source is radiogenic heat, caused by radioactive decay. The decay of aluminium-26 would have significantly heated planetary embryos, but due to its short half-life (less than a million years), any traces of it have long since vanished. There are small traces of unstable isotopes in common minerals, and all the terrestrial planets, and the Moon, experience some of this heating. The icy bodies of the outer solar system experience much less of this heat because they tend to not be very dense and not have much silicate material (radioactive elements concentrate in silicates).

On Neptune's moon Triton, and possibly on Mars, cryogeyser activity takes place. The source of heat is external (heat from the Sun) rather than internal.

=== Melting methods ===
==== Decompression melting ====
Decompression melting happens when solid material from deep beneath the body rises upwards. Pressure decreases as the material rises upwards, and so does the melting point. So, a rock that is solid at a given pressure and temperature can become liquid if the pressure, and thus melting point, decreases even if the temperature stays constant. However, in the case of water, increasing pressure decreases melting point until a pressure of 0.208 GPa is reached, after which the melting point increases with pressure.

==== Flux melting ====
Flux melting occurs when the melting point is lowered by the addition of volatiles, for example, water or carbon dioxide. Like decompression melting, it is not caused by an increase in temperature, but rather by a decrease in melting point.

==== Formation of cryomagma reservoirs ====
Cryovolcanism, instead of originating in a uniform subsurface ocean, may instead take place from discrete liquid reservoirs. The first way these can form is a plume of warm ice welling up and then sinking back down, forming a convection current. A model developed to investigate the effects of this on Europa found that energy from tidal heating became focused in these plumes, allowing melting to occur in these shallow depths as the plume spreads laterally (horizontally). The next is a switch from vertical to horizontal propagation of a fluid filled crack. Another mechanism is heating of ice from release of stress through lateral motion of fractures in the ice shell penetrating it from the surface, and even heating from large impacts can create such reservoirs.

=== Ascent of melts ===
Some features of volcanism found in Earth's crust

==== Diapirs ====
When material of a planetary body begins to melt, the melting first occurs in small pockets in certain high energy locations, for example grain boundary intersections and where different crystals react to form eutectic liquid, that initially remain isolated from one another, trapped inside rock. If the contact angle of the melted material allows the melt to wet crystal faces and run along grain boundaries, the melted material will accumulate into larger quantities. On the other hand, if the contact angle is greater than about 60 degrees, much more melt must form before it can separate from its parental rock. Studies of rocks on Earth suggest that melt in hot rocks quickly collects into pockets and veins that are much larger than the grain size, in contrast to the model of rigid melt percolation. Melt, instead of uniformly flowing out of source rock, flows out through rivulets which join to create larger veins. Under the influence of buoyancy, the melt rises. Diapirs may also form in non-silicate bodies, playing a similar role in moving warm material towards the surface.

==== Dikes ====
A dike is a vertical fluid-filled crack, from a mechanical standpoint it is a water filled crevasse turned upside down. As magma rises into the vertical crack, the low density of the magma compared to the wall rock means that the pressure falls less rapidly than in the surrounding denser rock. If the average pressure of the magma and the surrounding rock are equal, the pressure in the dike exceeds that of the enclosing rock at the top of the dike, and the pressure of the rock is greater than that of the dike at its bottom. So the magma thus pushes the crack upwards at its top, but the crack is squeezed closed at its bottom due to an elastic reaction (similar to the bulge next to a person sitting down on a springy sofa). Eventually, the tail gets so narrow it nearly pinches off, and no more new magma will rise into the crack. The crack continues to ascend as an independent pod of magma.

==== Standpipe model ====
This model of volcanic eruption posits that magma rises through a rigid open channel, in the lithosphere and settles at the level of hydrostatic equilibrium. Despite how it explains observations well (which newer models cannot), such as an apparent concordance of the elevation of volcanoes near each other, it cannot be correct and is now discredited, because the lithosphere thickness derived from it is too large for the assumption of a rigid open channel to hold.

==== Cryovolcanic melt ascent ====
Unlike silicate volcanism, where melt can rise by its own buoyancy until it reaches the shallow crust, in cryovolcanism, the water (cryomagmas tend to be water based) is denser than the ice above it. One way to allow cryomagma to reach the surface is to make the water buoyant, by making the water less dense, either through the presence of other compounds that reverse negative buoyancy, or with the addition of exsolved gas bubbles in the cryomagma that were previously dissolved into it (that makes the cryomagma less dense), or with the presence of a densifying agent in the ice shell. Another is to pressurise the fluid to overcome negative buoyancy and make it reach the surface. When the ice shell above a subsurface ocean thickens, it can pressurise the entire ocean (in cryovolcanism, frozen water or brine is less dense than in liquid form). When a reservoir of liquid partially freezes, the remaining liquid is pressurised in the same way.

For a crack in the ice shell to propagate upwards, the fluid in it must have positive buoyancy or external stresses must be strong enough to break through the ice. External stresses could include those from tides or from overpressure due to freezing as explained above.

There is yet another possible mechanism for ascent of cryovolcanic melts. If a fracture with water in it reaches an ocean or subsurface fluid reservoir, the water would rise to its level of hydrostatic equilibrium, at about nine-tenths of the way to the surface. Tides which induce compression and tension in the ice shell may pump the water farther up.

A 1988 article proposed a possibility for fractures propagating upwards from the subsurface ocean of Jupiter's moon Europa. It proposed that a fracture propagating upwards would possess a low pressure zone at its tip, allowing volatiles dissolved within the water to exsolve into gas. The elastic nature of the ice shell would likely prevent the fracture reaching the surface, and the crack would instead pinch off, enclosing the gas and liquid. The gas would increase buoyancy and could allow the crack to reach the surface.

Even impacts can create conditions that allow for enhanced ascent of magma. An impact may remove the top few kilometres of crust, and pressure differences caused by the difference in height between the basin and the height of the surrounding terrain could allow eruption of magma which otherwise would have stayed beneath the surface. A 2011 article showed that there would be zones of enhanced magma ascent at the margins of an impact basin.

Not all of these mechanisms, and maybe even none, operate on a given body.

== Types ==
=== Silicate volcanism ===
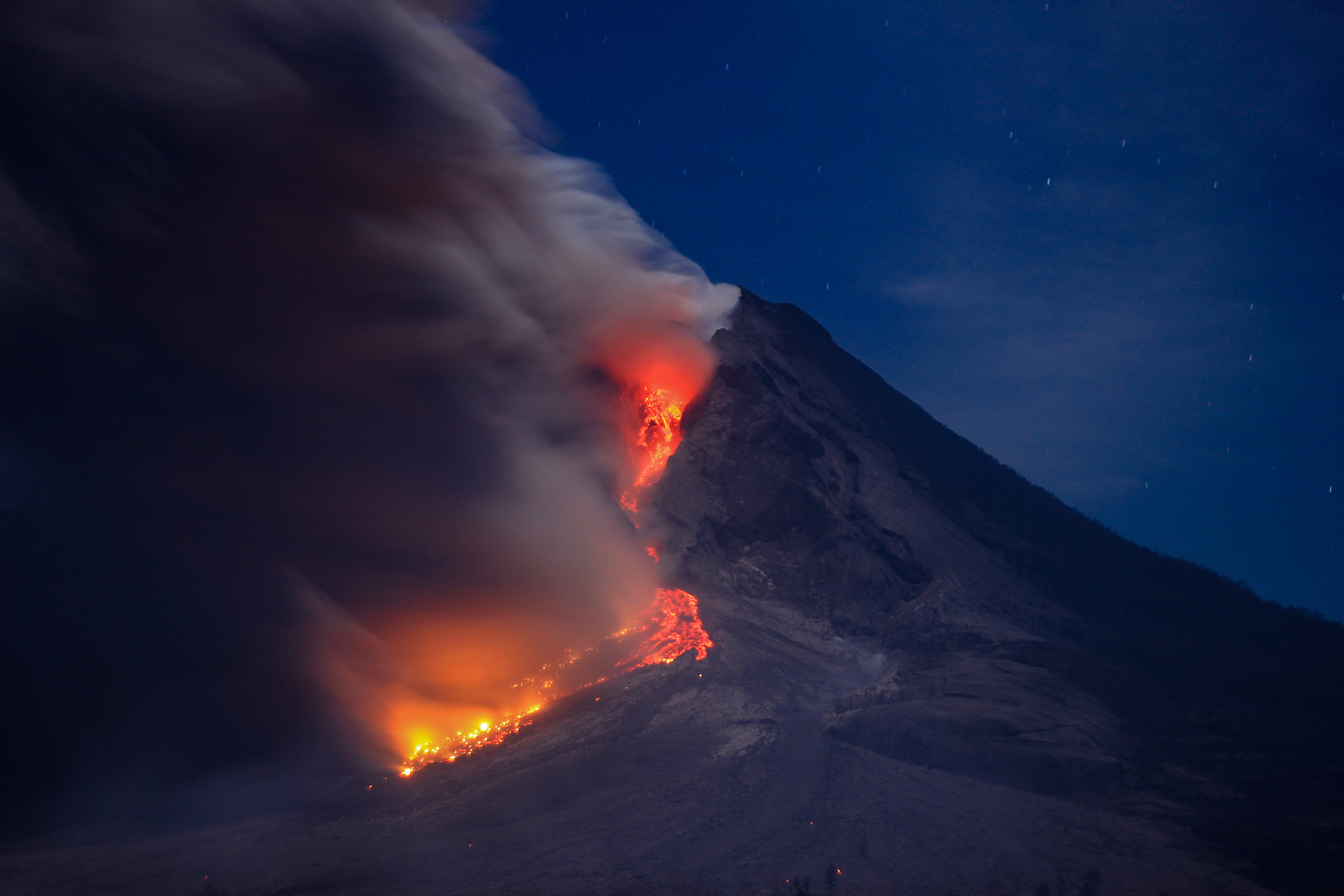
The high initial temperatures of silicate lavas mean that they emit visible light before cooling.

Silicate volcanism occurs where silicate materials are erupted. Silicate lava flows, like those found on Earth, solidify at about 1000 degrees Celsius.

=== Mud volcanoes ===
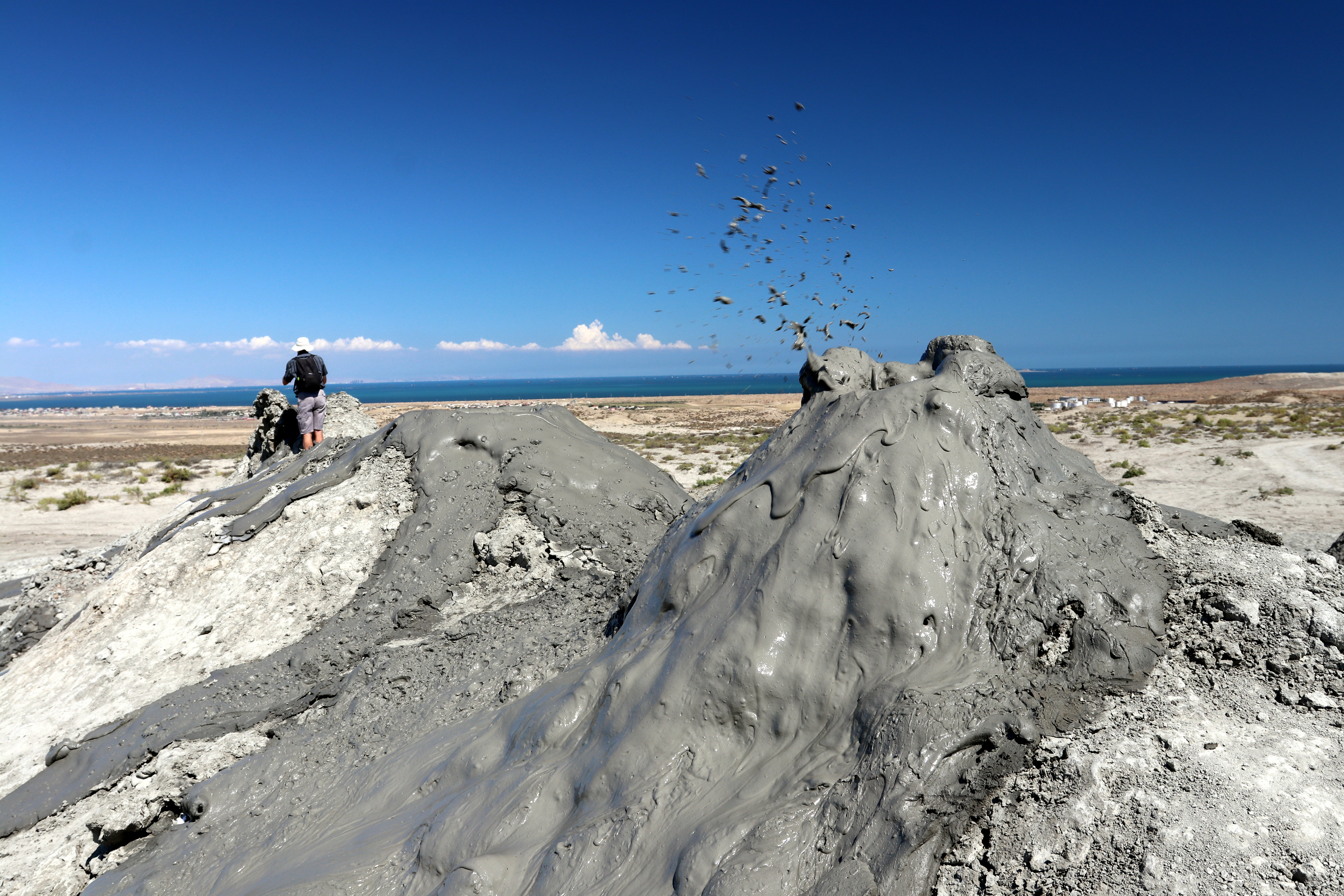
Eruption of mud at Dashgil mud volcano in Gobustan, Azerbaijan

A mud volcano is formed when fluids and gases under pressure erupt to the surface, bringing mud with them. This pressure can be caused by the weight of overlying sediments over the fluid which pushes down on the fluid, preventing it from escaping, by fluid being trapped in the sediment, migrating from deeper sediment into other sediment or being made from chemical reactions in the sediment. They often erupt quietly, but sometimes they erupt flammable gases such as methane.

=== Cryovolcanism ===
Cryovolcanism is the eruption of volatiles into an environment below their freezing point. The processes behind it are different to silicate volcanism because the cryomagma (which is usually water-based) is normally denser than its surroundings, meaning it cannot rise by its own buoyancy.

=== Sulfur ===
Sulfur lavas have a different behaviour to silicate ones. First, sulfur has a low melting point of about 120 degrees Celsius. Also, after cooling down to about 175 degrees Celsius the lava rapidly loses viscosity, unlike silicate lavas like those found on Earth.

== Lava types ==
When magma erupts onto a planet's surface, it is termed lava. Viscous lavas form short, stubby glass-rich flows. These usually have a wavy solidified surface texture.

More fluid lavas have solidified surface textures that volcanologists classify into four types. Pillow lava forms when a trigger, often lava making contact with water, causes a lava flow to cool rapidly. This splinters the surface of the lava, and the magma then collects into sacks that often pile up in front of the flow, forming a structure called a pillow. A’a lava has a rough, spiny surface made of clasts of lava called clinkers. Block lava is another type of lava, with less jagged fragments than in a’a lava. Pahoehoe lava is by far the most common lava type, both on Earth and probably the other terrestrial planets. It has a smooth surface, with mounds, hollows and folds.

== Gentle/explosive activity ==
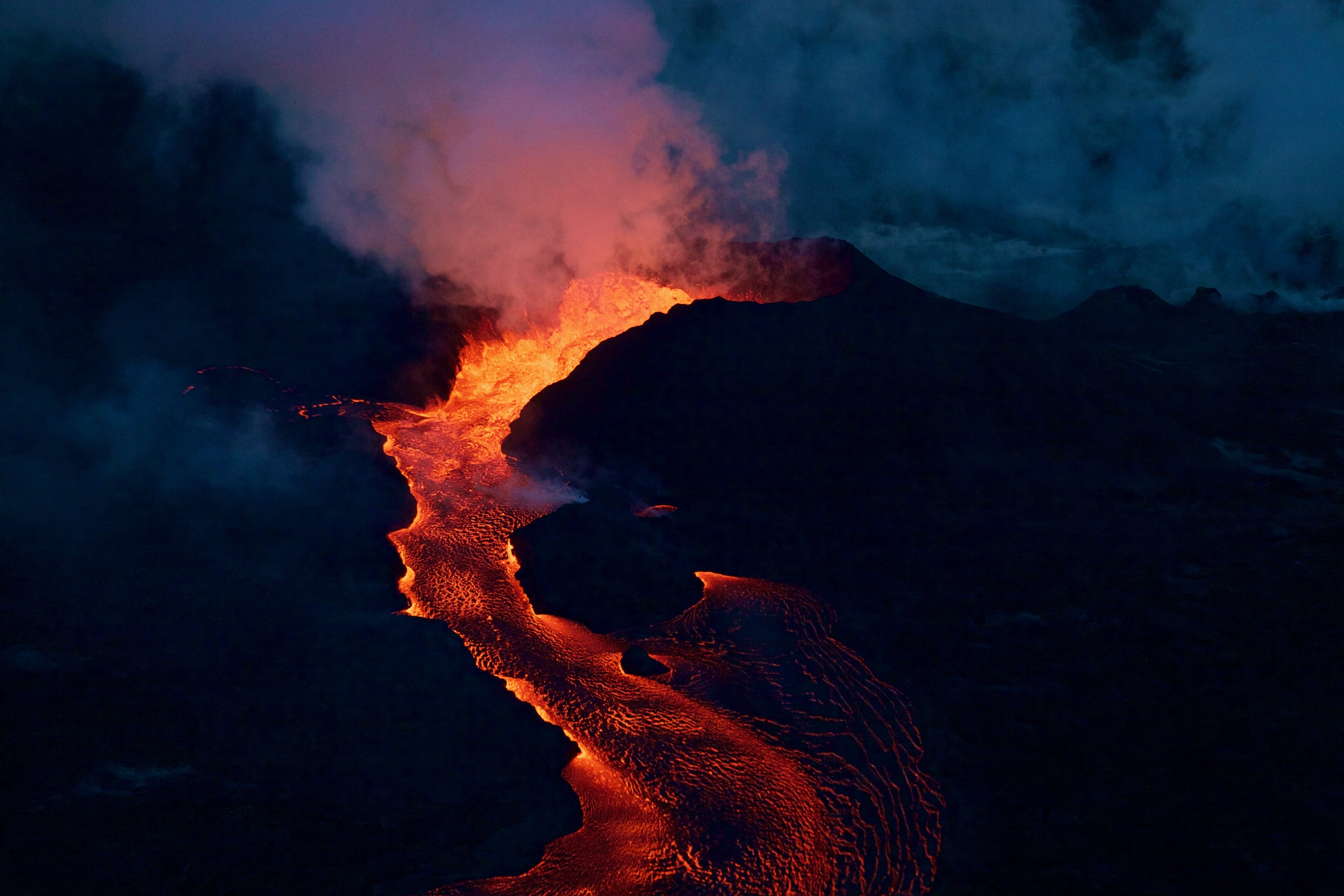
A gentle, or effusive, volcanic eruption, in which liquid material (lava) gently flows from a vent, in this case in south-eastern Hawai’i island

Satellite animation of the initial ash plume and shockwave of the 2022 Hunga Tonga–Hunga Ha’apai eruption and tsunami. The massive explosive eruption was hundreds of times more powerful than the atomic bomb dropped on Hiroshima.

A volcanic eruption could just be a simple outpouring of material onto the surface of a planet, but they usually involve a complex mixture of solids, liquids and gases which behave in equally complex ways. Some types of explosive eruptions can release energy a quarter that of an equivalent mass of TNT.

=== Causes of explosive activity ===
==== Exsolution of volatiles ====
Volcanic eruptions on Earth have been consistently observed to progress from erupting gas rich material to gas depleted material, although an eruption may alternate between erupting gas rich to gas depleted material and vice versa multiple times. This can be explained by the enrichment of magma at the top of a dike by gas which is released when the dike breaches the surface, followed by magma from lower down than did not get enriched with gas.

The reason the dissolved gas in the magma separates from it when the magma nears the surface is due to the effects of temperature and pressure on gas solubility. Pressure increases gas solubility, and if a liquid with dissolved gas in it depressurises, the gas will tend to exsolve (or separate) from the liquid. An example of this is what happens when a bottle of carbonated drink is quickly opened: when the seal is opened, pressure decreases and bubbles of carbon dioxide gas appear throughout the liquid.

Fluid magmas erupt quietly. Any gas that has exsolved from the magma easily escapes even before it reaches the surface. However, in viscous magmas, gases remain trapped in the magma even after they have exsolved, forming bubbles inside the magma. These bubbles enlarge as the magma nears the surface due to the dropping pressure, and the magma grows substantially. This fact gives volcanoes erupting such material a tendency to ‘explode’, although instead of the pressure increase associated with an explosion, pressure always decreases in a volcanic eruption.

Generally, explosive cryovolcanism is driven by exsolution of volatiles that were previously dissolved into the cryomagma, similar to what happens in explosive silicate volcanism as seen on Earth, which is what is mainly covered below.

==== Physics of a volatile-driven explosive eruption ====
Silica-rich magmas cool beneath the surface before they erupt. As they do this, bubbles exsolve from the magma. As the magma nears the surface, the bubbles and thus the magma increase in volume. The resulting pressure eventually breaks through the surface, and the release of pressure causes more gas to exsolve, doing so explosively. The gas may expand at hundreds of metres per second, expanding upward and outward. As the eruption progresses, a chain reaction causes the magma to be ejected at higher and higher speeds.

===== Volcanic ash formation =====
The violently expanding gas disperses and breaks up magma, forming a colloid of gas and magma called volcanic ash. The cooling of the gas in the ash as it expands chills the magma fragments, often forming tiny glass shards recognisable as portions of the walls of former liquid bubbles. In more fluid magmas the bubble walls may have time to reform into spherical liquid droplets. The final state of the colloids depends strongly on the ratio of liquid to gas. Gas-poor magmas end up cooling into rocks with small cavities, becoming vesicular lava. Gas-rich magmas cool to form rocks with cavities that nearly touch, with an average density less than that of water, forming pumice. Meanwhile, other material can be accelerated with the gas, becoming volcanic bombs. These can travel with so much energy that large ones can create craters when they hit the ground.

===== Pyroclastic flows =====
A colloid of volcanic gas and magma can form as a density current called a pyroclastic flow. This occurs when erupted material falls back to the surface. The colloid is somewhat fluidised by the gas, allowing it to spread. Pyroclastic flows can often climb over obstacles, and devastate human life. Pyroclastic flows are a common feature at explosive volcanoes on Earth. Pyroclastic flows have been found on Venus, for example at the Dione Regio volcanoes.

==== Phreatic eruption ====
A phreatic eruption can occur when hot water under pressure is depressurised. Depressurisation reduces the boiling point of the water, so when depressurised the water suddenly boils. Or it may happen when groundwater is suddenly heated, flashing to steam suddenly. When water turns into steam in a phreatic eruption, it expands at supersonic speeds, up to 1,700 times its original volume. This can be enough to shatter solid rock, and hurl rock fragments hundreds of metres.

==== Phreatomagmatic eruption ====
A phreatomagmatic eruption occurs when hot magma makes contact with water, creating an explosion.

==== Clathrate hydrates ====
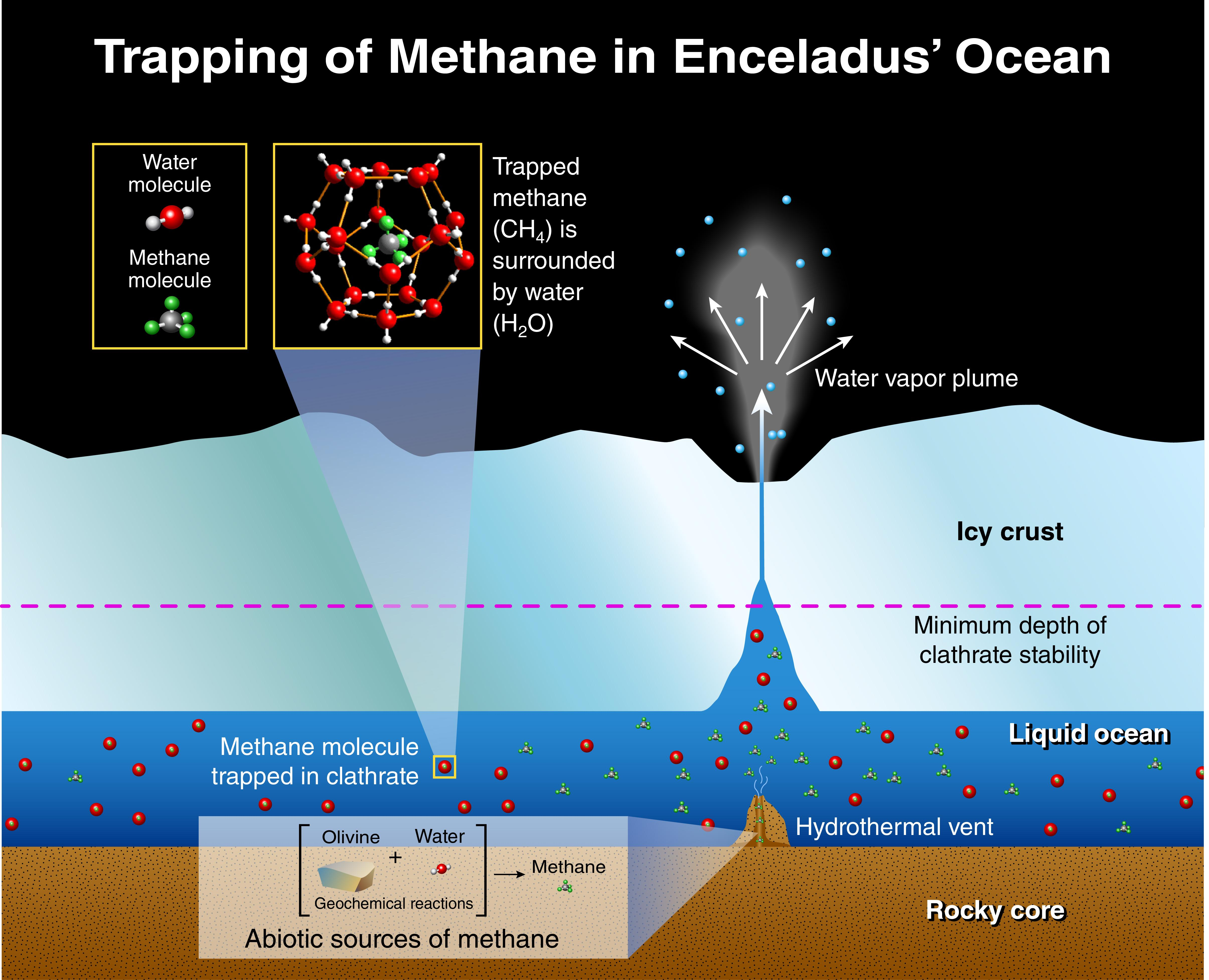
Diagrammatic representation of a plume on Enceladus

One mechanism for explosive cryovolcanism is cryomagma making contact with clathrate hydrates. Clathrate hydrates, if exposed to warm temperatures, readily decompose. A 1982 article pointed out the possibility that the production of pressurised gas upon destabilisation of clathrate hydrates making contact with warm rising magma could produce an explosion that breaks through the surface, resulting in explosive cryovolcanism.

==== Water vapor in a vacuum ====
If a fracture reaches the surface of an icy body and the column of rising water is exposed to the near-vacuum of the surface of most icy bodies, it will immediately start to boil, because its vapor pressure is much more than the ambient pressure. Not only that, but any volatiles in the water will exsolve. The combination of these processes will release droplets and vapor, which can rise up the fracture, creating a plume. This is thought to be partially responsible for Enceladus's ice plumes.

== Occurrence ==
=== Earth ===
On Earth, volcanoes are most often found where tectonic plates are diverging or converging, and because most of Earth's plate boundaries are underwater, most volcanoes are found underwater. For example, a mid-ocean ridge, such as the Mid-Atlantic Ridge, has volcanoes caused by divergent tectonic plates whereas the Pacific Ring of Fire has volcanoes caused by convergent tectonic plates. Volcanoes can also form where there is stretching and thinning of the crust's plates, such as in the East African Rift and the Wells Gray-Clearwater volcanic field and Rio Grande rift in North America. Volcanism away from plate boundaries has been postulated to arise from upwelling diapirs from the core–mantle boundary, 3,000 kilometers (1,900 mi) deep within Earth. This results in hotspot volcanism, of which the Hawaiian hotspot is an example. Volcanoes are usually not created where two tectonic plates slide past one another. In 1912–1952, in the Northern Hemisphere, studies show that within this time, winters were warmer due to no massive eruptions that had taken place. These studies demonstrate how these eruptions can cause changes within the Earth's atmosphere.

Large eruptions can affect atmospheric temperature as ash and droplets of sulfuric acid obscure the Sun and cool Earth's troposphere. Historically, large volcanic eruptions have been followed by volcanic winters which have caused catastrophic famines.

=== Moon ===
Earth's Moon has no large volcanoes and no current volcanic activity, although recent evidence suggests it may still possess a partially molten core. However, the Moon does have many volcanic features such as maria (the darker patches seen on the Moon), rilles and domes.

=== Venus ===
The planet Venus has a surface that is 90% basalt, indicating that volcanism played a major role in shaping its surface. The planet may have had a major global resurfacing event about 500 million years ago, from what scientists can tell from the density of impact craters on the surface. Lava flows are widespread and forms of volcanism not present on Earth occur as well. Changes in the planet's atmosphere and observations of lightning have been attributed to ongoing volcanic eruptions, although there is no confirmation of whether or not Venus is still volcanically active. However, radar sounding by the Magellan probe revealed evidence for comparatively recent volcanic activity at Venus's highest volcano Maat Mons, in the form of ash flows near the summit and on the northern flank. However, the interpretation of the flows as ash flows has been questioned.

=== Mars ===
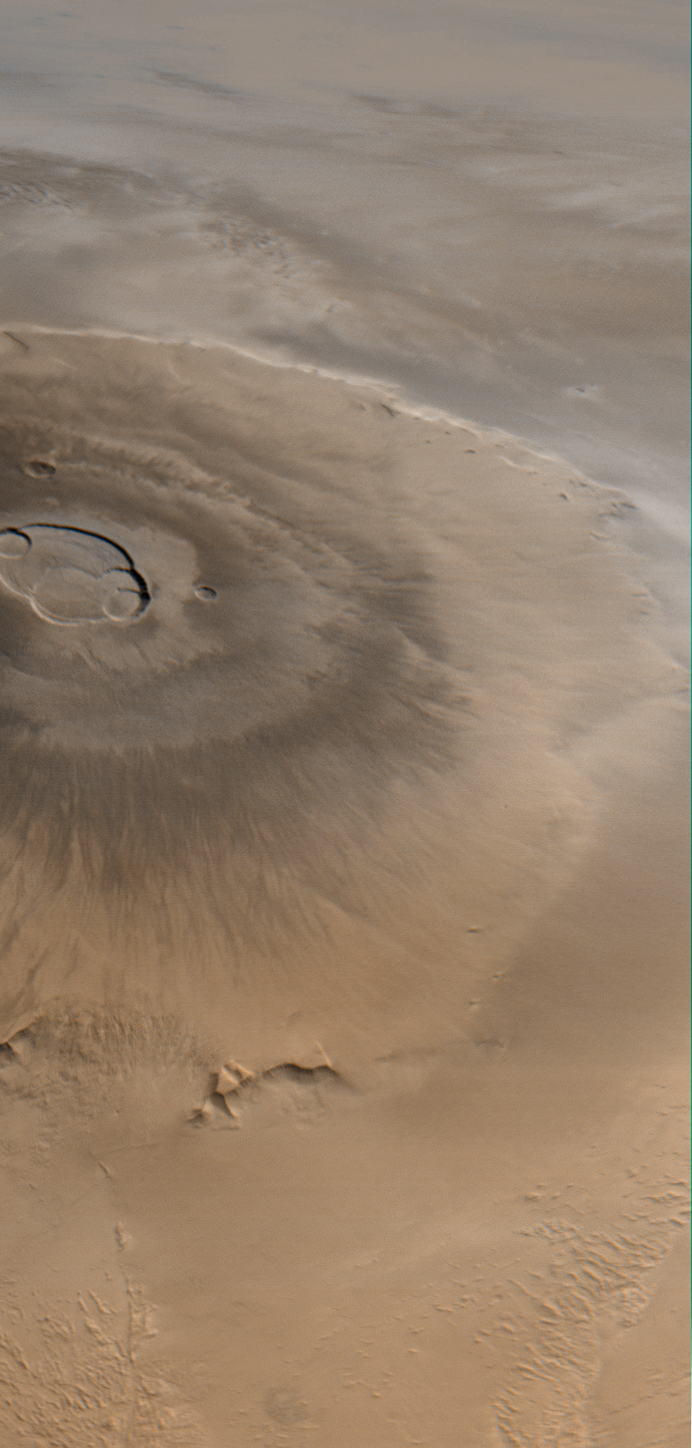
Olympus Mons (Latin, "Mount Olympus"), located on the planet Mars, is the tallest known mountain in the Solar System.

There are several extinct volcanoes on Mars, four of which are vast shield volcanoes far bigger than any on Earth. They include Arsia Mons, Ascraeus Mons, Hecates Tholus, Olympus Mons, and Pavonis Mons. These volcanoes have been extinct for many millions of years, but the European Mars Express spacecraft has found evidence that volcanic activity may have occurred on Mars in the recent past as well.

=== Moons of Jupiter ===
==== Io ====
Jupiter's moon Io is the most volcanically active object in the Solar System because of tidal interaction with Jupiter. It is covered with volcanoes that erupt sulfur, sulfur dioxide and silicate rock, and as a result, Io is constantly being resurfaced. There are only two bodies in the Solar System where volcanoes can be easily seen due to their high activity, Earth and Io. Its lavas are the hottest known anywhere in the Solar System, with temperatures exceeding 1,800 K (1,500 °C). In February 2001, the largest recorded volcanic eruptions in the Solar System occurred on Io.

==== Europa ====
Europa, the smallest of Jupiter's Galilean moons, also appears to have an active volcanic system, except that its volcanic activity is entirely in the form of water, which freezes into ice on the frigid surface. This process is known as cryovolcanism, and is apparently most common on the moons of the outer planets of the Solar System.

=== Moons of Saturn and Neptune ===
In 1989, the Voyager 2 spacecraft observed cryovolcanoes (ice volcanoes) on Triton, a moon of Neptune, and in 2005 the Cassini–Huygens probe photographed fountains of frozen particles erupting from Enceladus, a moon of Saturn. The ejecta may be composed of water, liquid nitrogen, ammonia, dust, or methane compounds. Cassini–Huygens also found evidence of a methane-spewing cryovolcano on the Saturnian moon Titan, which is believed to be a significant source of the methane found in its atmosphere. It is theorized that cryovolcanism may also be present on the Kuiper Belt Object Quaoar.

=== Exoplanets ===
A 2010 study of the exoplanet COROT-7b, which was detected by transit in 2009, suggested that tidal heating from the host star very close to the planet and neighboring planets could generate intense volcanic activity similar to that found on Io.

== See also ==
- 29P/Schwassmann–Wachmann
- 4 Vesta
- Bimodal volcanism
- Extraterrestrial liquid water
- Fumarole
- Gas laws
- Geology of Ceres
- Geology of Mercury
- Geology of Pluto
- Geyser
- Glaciovolcanism
- Hotspot
- Hydrothermal vent
- Igneous rock
- Intraplate volcanism
- Lava planet
- Magma ocean
- Magmatism
- Mantle plume
- Plate tectonics
- Prediction of volcanic activity
- Seafloor spreading
- Volcanic arc
- Volcanic rock
- Volcanism on Io
- Volcanism on Mars
- Volcanism on the Moon
- Volcanism on Venus
- Volcanology
