= BD+05 4868 =

Binary star in the constellation Pegasus

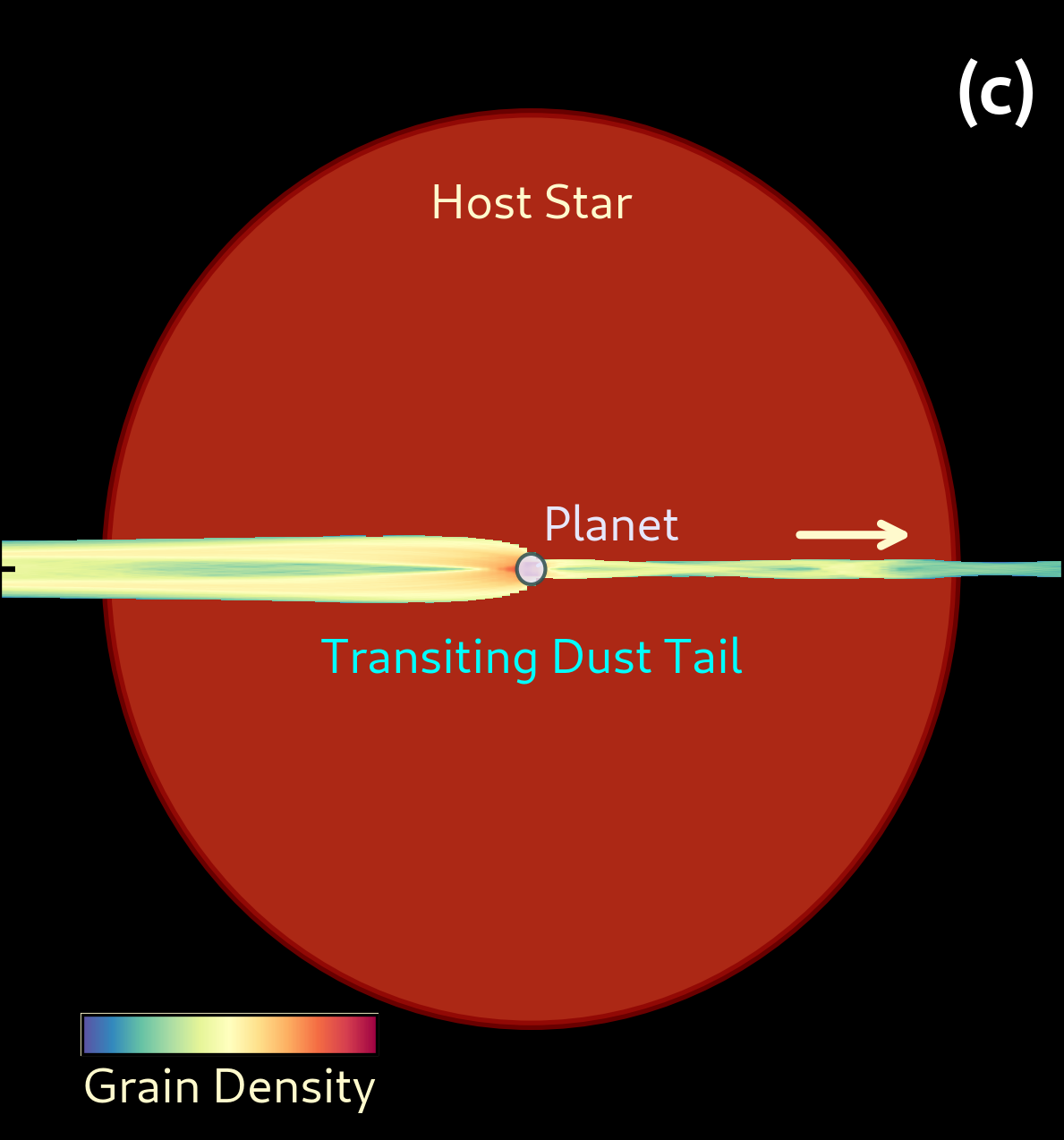
- Visualization of the simulated dust tail transiting in front of the primary Credit: Hon et al.

Observation data Epoch J2000 Equinox J2000
- Constellation: Pegasus
- BD+05 4868A
- Right ascension: 21^{h} 47^{m} 26.52^{s}
- Declination: +06° 36′ 17.5″
- Apparent magnitude (V): 10.16
- BD+05 4868B
- Right ascension: 21^{h} 47^{m} 26.71^{s}
- Declination: +06° 36′ 18.4″

Characteristics
- Spectral type: mid-K+M

Astrometry

BD+05 4868A
Radial velocity (R_{v})	−25.56±0.15 km/s
Proper motion (μ)	RA: 205.593±0.017 mas/yr Dec.: 106.359±0.012 mas/yr
Parallax (π)	22.9322±0.0163 mas
Distance	142.2 ± 0.1 ly (43.61 ± 0.03 pc)

BD+05 4868B
Radial velocity (R_{v})	24.62±1.60 km/s
Proper motion (μ)	RA: 212.158±0.064 mas/yr Dec.: 112.173±0.049 mas/yr
Parallax (π)	23.1585±0.0629 mas
Distance	140.8 ± 0.4 ly (43.2 ± 0.1 pc)

Details

BD+05 4868A
Mass	0.70±0.02 M_{☉}
Radius	0.69±0.02 R_{☉}
Luminosity	0.192±0.005 L_{☉}
Surface gravity (log g)	4.60+0.03 −0.02 cgs
Temperature	4,540±110 K
Metallicity [Fe/H]	−0.07±0.09 dex
Age	11.1+1.7 −3.0 Gyr

BD+05 4868B
Mass	0.43±0.03 M_{☉}
Radius	0.42±0.02 R_{☉}
Luminosity	0.023±0.001 L_{☉}
Surface gravity (log g)	4.83±0.03 cgs
Temperature	3,480±70 K

Position (relative to BD+05 4868A)
Component	BD+05 4868B
Epoch of observation	October 2024
Angular distance	3″
Projected separation	132.037±0.002 AU

Other designations
- BD+05 4868A: HIP 107587, G 93-37, LSPM J2147+0636, LTT 18540, 2MASS J21472654+0636178, TIC 466376085, TYC 556-856-1, UCAC2 34205672, WISE J214726.69+063618.9, Gaia DR3 2700378125204437760
- BD+05 4868B: Gaia DR3 2700378125203895808

Database references
SIMBAD	data
- B

BD+05 4868 is a binary star consisting of a K-dwarf and an M-dwarf. It is notable for a planetary companion around the primary star. This planet, named BD+05 4868Ab, orbits the star so close that it has begun to disintegrate, creating a large comet-like tail which can be seen in transits.

BD+05 4868 was first cataloged in the Bonner Durchmusterung and in 1961 the star was identified as a proper motion star by Giclas et al. In 1984 its spectrum was observed for the first time, identifying it as a K5: type star. The star was first identified as a binary from Gaia data. The common proper motion and parallax indicate that the pair is physically bound. The binary was also detected with the Las Cumbres Observatory Global Telescope (LCOGT) 2 m Faulkes Telescope North and with Keck NIRC2.

== Planetary system ==
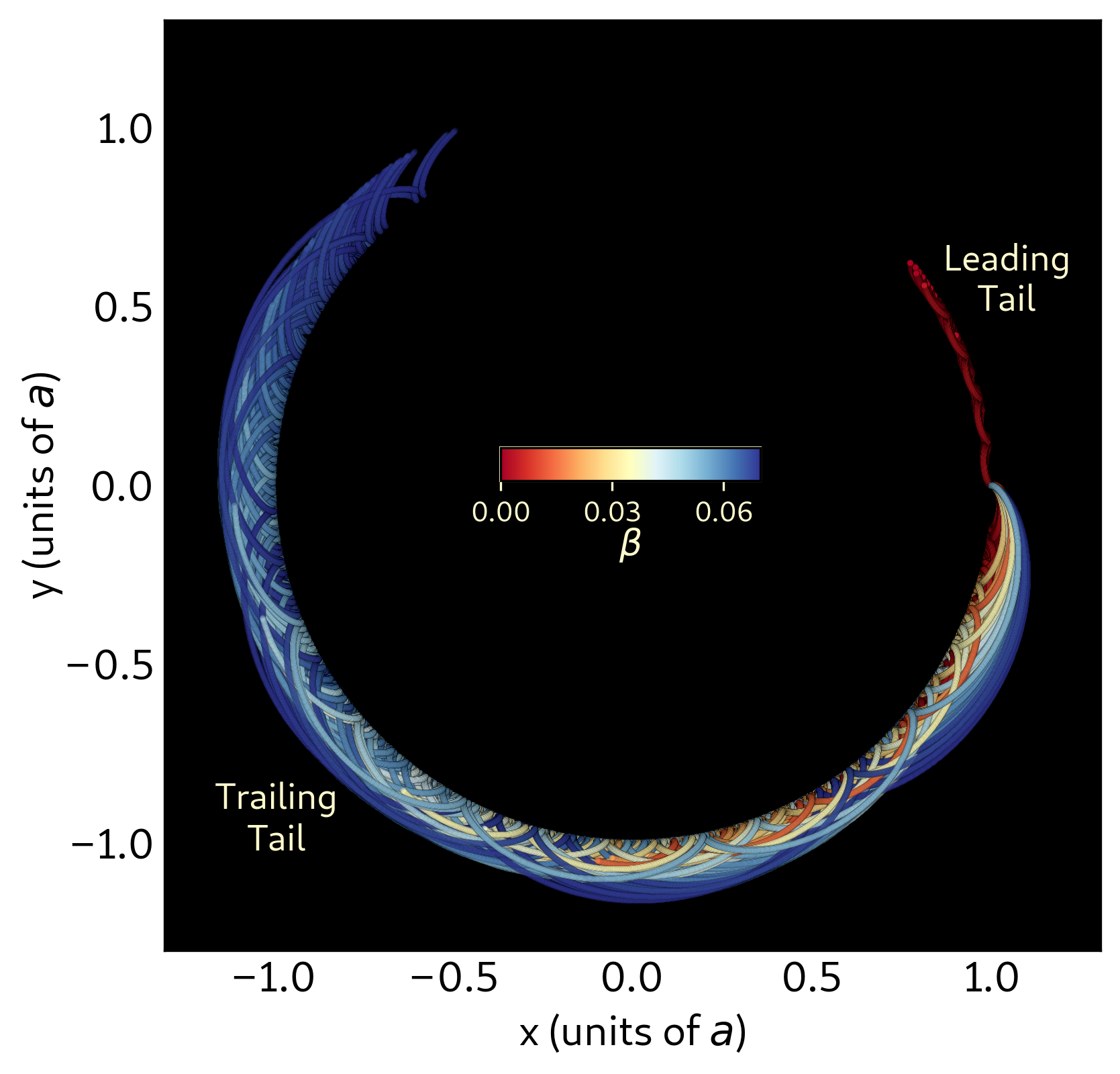
Top-down view of the simulated dust tail produced by BD+05 4868Ab

The planet BD+05 4868Ab was discovered with TESS in transits. The transits are unusually deep with variable depths of 0.8-2.0%. The transits are also asymmetric, with a short ingress followed by a long egress. The researchers were also able to detect the transits in ground-based ASAS-SN and LCOGT 2m telescope data. Seven spectra of the primary were obtained with the WIYN 3.5m Telescope, detecting no radial velocity signal larger than a few m/s.

The researchers interpret the transits as a disintegrating rocky planet, similar to Kepler-1520b, KOI-2700b and K2-22b. The difference is that BD+05 4868Ab is around a relative bright (V=10.16 mag) host star and the transits are consistently deep. Other disintegrating rocky planets show weaker transits (~0.5% transit depth) that are also variable. This makes BD+05 4868Ab a compelling target for transmission spectroscopy, which could characterize exoplanet mineralogy.

The planet also has a relatively low equilibrium temperature of 1,820±45 K, which could lead to differences in dust properties, when compared to other disintegrating planets. The transit shows both a leading and a trailing tail, which helped to constrain the grain sizes to be at around 1–10 μm. Comparisons to models suggest that the planet began with a mass that could be larger than the mass of Mercury. The planet lost mass due to the evaporation of minerals on the surface over several billion years. The current mass and radius of the planet is not known, but the researchers assume a mass of about 0.02 M_{🜨} (about lunar-mass) and a radius of 2,000 km (about that of Kepler-37b) in their modelling. Currently the mass-loss rate is at 10 M_{🜨} per billion years, meaning it will evaporate in about 2 million years.

The BD+05 4868A system
Companion	Mass	Semimajor axis (AU)	Orbital period	Discovery year
b	0.02 M_{🜨}	0.0208(3)	1.271869(1) days	2025
