= BD+05 4868Ab =

Disintegrating exoplanet

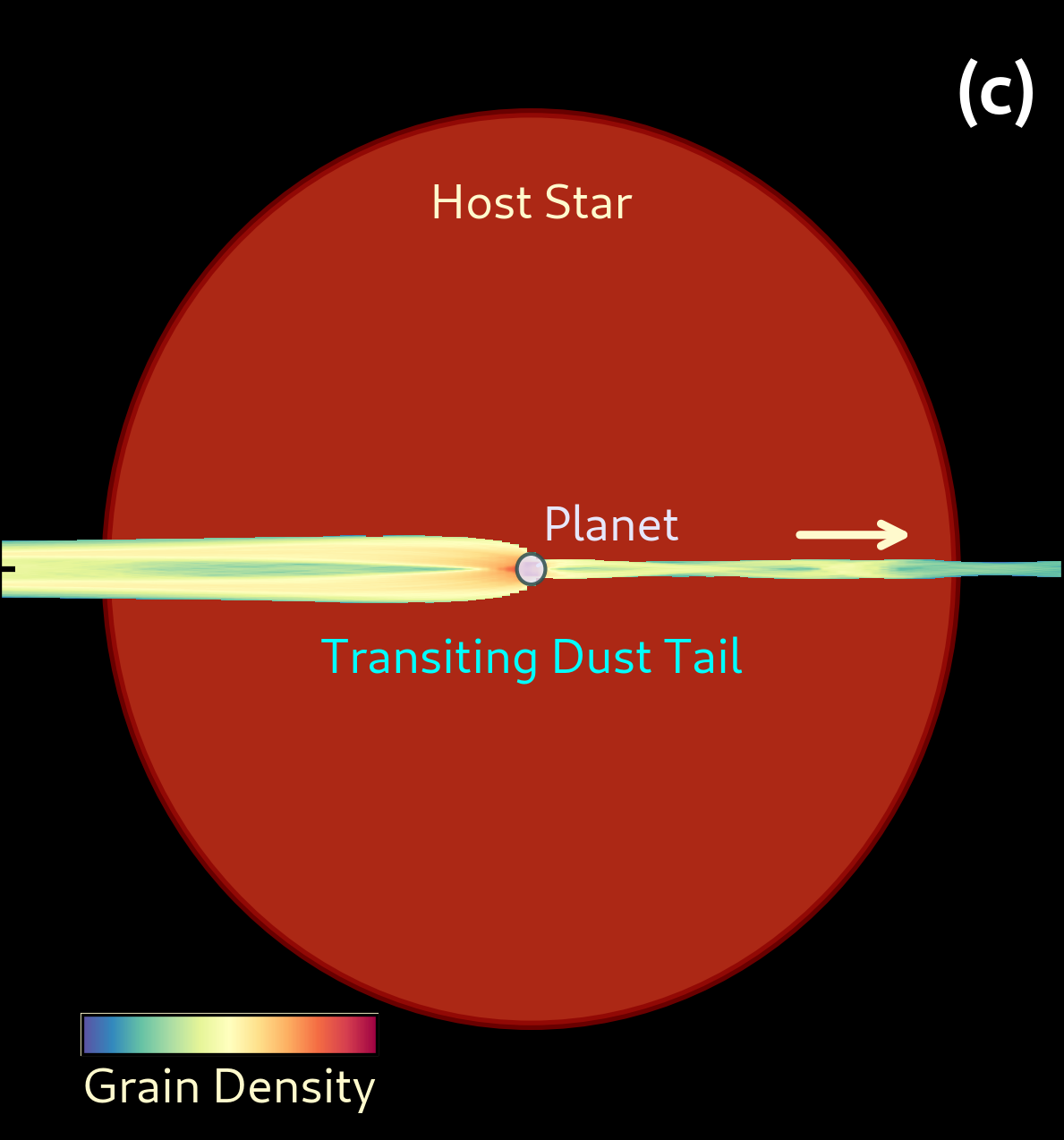
- A simulation of the dust trails produced by BD+05 4868Ab.

Discovery
- Discovered by: Hon et al.
- Discovery date: 2025
- Detection method: Transit

Orbital characteristics
- Semi-major axis: 0.0208
- Orbital period (sidereal): 1.27 d
- Star: BD+05 4868

Physical characteristics
- Temperature: 1820 K

BD+05 4868Ab is an exoplanet located 140 light years from Earth in the constellation of Pegasus. It orbits at a distance of 0.02 AU around the primary star of the BD+05 4868 binary star system. Due to the close proximity to its host star, the planet is likely covered in magma, making it a lava planet.

It was discovered in 2025 using the transit method.

== Evaporation ==
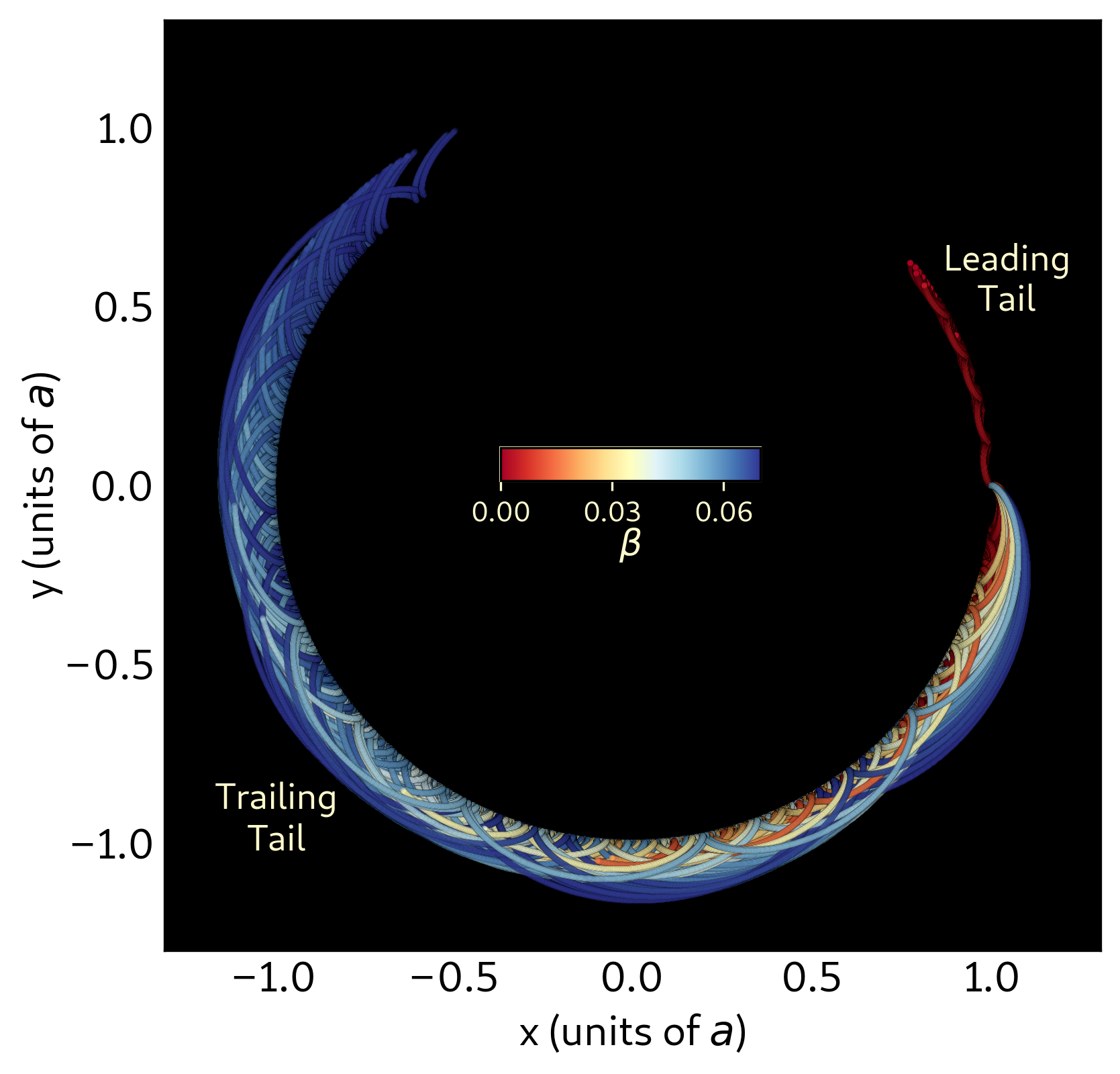
A simulation of the dust grains trajectory made by BD+05 4868Ab.

The planet currently has a mass similar to the Moon. However, mass is being stripped off, forming long comet-like trails 9 million kilometers long behind and in front of it. These trails extend over half of the planet's orbit around the star. Dust grains found within the trails are found to be 1–10 microns in size. BD+05 4868Ab represents an extreme case of a catastrophically evaporating planet. It is thought that BD+05 4868Ab initially had a mass greater than Mercury, but over a time scale of several billion years, it lost that mass due to evaporation.

As of 2025 it is one of four known disintegrating planets, along with Kepler-1520b, KOI-2700b, and K2-22b.
