= Kepler-37b =

Sub-Earth orbiting Kepler-37, currently the smallest known exoplanet

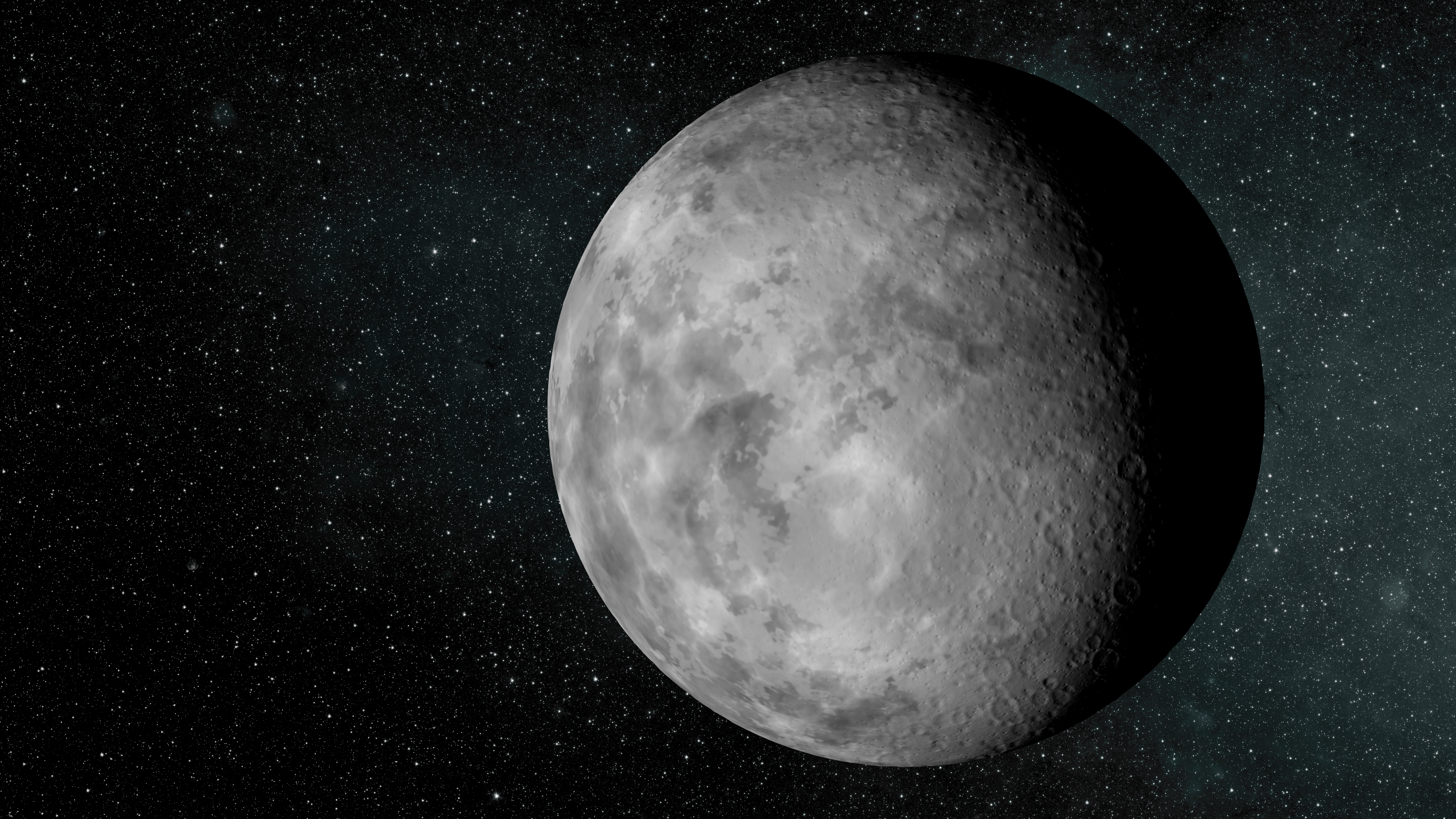
- Artist's impression of Kepler-37b.

Discovery
- Discovery site: Kepler space telescope
- Discovery date: February 20, 2013
- Detection method: Transit

Orbital characteristics
- Semi-major axis: 0.1019±0.0014 AU
- Eccentricity: <0.098
- Orbital period (sidereal): 13.367020(60) d
- Inclination: 88.63°+0.30° −0.53°
- Star: Kepler-37

Physical characteristics
- Mean radius: 0.3098+0.0059 −0.0076 R_{🜨}
- Mass: <0.79 M_{🜨} (Note: Masses more than a few times that of the Moon result in unphysically high densities.)
- Temperature: 718±10 K (445 °C; 833 °F, equilibrium)

Kepler-37b is an exoplanet orbiting the star Kepler-37 in the constellation Lyra. As of February 2013, it is the smallest planet discovered around a main-sequence star, with a radius slightly greater than that of the Moon and slightly smaller than that of Mercury. The measurements do not constrain its mass, but masses above a few times that of the Moon give unphysically high densities.

== Characteristics ==
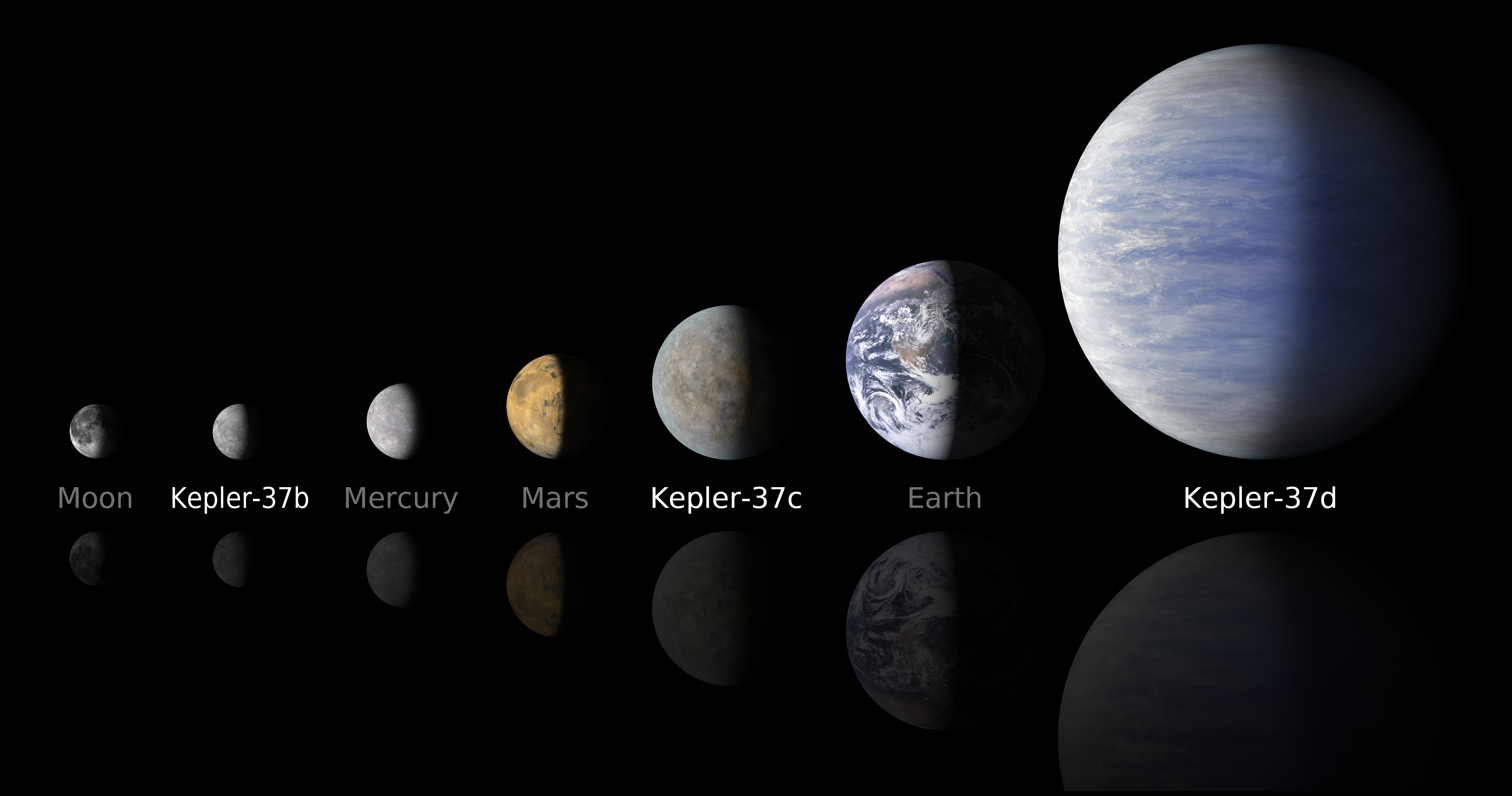
A size comparison of the planets in the Kepler-37 system and objects in the Solar System

=== Mass, radius and temperature ===
Size comparison
Earth	Kepler-37b
	Exoplanet

Kepler-37b is a sub-Earth, an exoplanet with a radius and mass smaller than Earth. Its equilibrium temperature is 718 K (445 °C; 833 °F). Because of its small size and high temperatures, it is not expected to have an atmosphere. Its radius is approximately 0.31 R_{🜨} (about 1,980 kilometres (1,230 mi)), slightly larger than the Moon (0.27 R_{🜨}), but a little smaller than Mercury (0.38 R_{🜨}). Due to its small size, it is very likely Kepler-37b is a rocky planet with a solid surface. Furthermore, it is too hot to support liquid water on its surface.

=== Host star ===
The planet orbits a (G-type) star similar to the Sun, named Kepler-37, orbited by a total of four planets. The star has a mass of 0.80 M_{☉} and a radius of 0.79 R_{☉}. It has a temperature of 5417 K and is 5.66 billion years old. In comparison, the Sun is 4.6 billion years old, and has a temperature of 5778 K.

The star's apparent magnitude, or how bright it appears from Earth's perspective, is 9.71. Therefore, it is too dim to be seen with the naked eye.

=== Orbit ===
Kepler-37b orbits its parent star at a distance of about 15 million kilometers (9.3 million miles), with a period of roughly 13 days at a distance of 0.1 AU (compared to Mercury's distance from the Sun, which is about 0.38 AU). The outer two planets in the system have orbital periods within one percent of the 8:5 and 3:1 resonances with Kepler-37b's period.

== Discovery ==
Kepler-37b, along with two other planets, Kepler-37c and Kepler-37d, were discovered by the Kepler space telescope, which observes stellar transits. After observing transits of Kepler-37b, astronomers had to compare it with the size of the parent star.

The size of the star was obtained using asteroseismology; Kepler-37 is currently the smallest star to be studied using this process. This allowed the size of Kepler-37b to be determined "with extreme accuracy".

To date, Kepler-37b is the smallest planet discovered around a main-sequence star (Note: The pulsar planet PSR B1257+12 A has a comparable mass. The actual size of PSR B1257+12 A is unknown, but is likely comparable to Kepler-37b.) outside the Solar System. Detection of Kepler-37b was possible due to its short orbital period, relative brightness, and low activity of its host star, allowing brightness data to average out quickly. The discovery of Kepler-37b has led Jack Lissauer, a scientist at NASA's Ames Research Center, to conjecture that "such little planets are common".

== See also ==
- List of exoplanet extremes
- List of smallest exoplanets

== Notes ==
Records
Preceded by PSR B1257+12 A	Least massive exoplanet 2013—2015	Succeeded by WD 1145+017 b
Preceded by Kepler-42 d	Smallest-radius exoplanet 2013—2015	Succeeded by WD 1145+017 b
