= KOI-2700b =

Disintegrating exoplanet

Discovery
- Discovered by: Saul Rappaport et al.
- Discovery date: March 3, 2014 (candidate); December 3, 2017 (confirmed)
- Detection method: Transit method

Designations
- Alternative names: KOI 2700.01; KIC 8639908 b; UCAC4 674-076576 b; 2MASS J19480085+4446303 b

Orbital characteristics
- Semi-major axis: 0.0150(4) AU
- Orbital period (sidereal): 0.910022(5) d
- Inclination: 85.1–88.6°
- Star: KIC 8639908

Physical characteristics
- Mean radius: <1.06 R_{🜨}, ≲0.3 R_{🜨}; ≤0.871 R_{🜨}
- Mass: <0.86 M_{🜨}, ≲0.03 M_{🜨}
- Temperature: 1,850 K (1,580 °C; 2,870 °F) (equilibrium)

KOI-2700b is a confirmed exoplanet that orbits the K-type main-sequence star KIC 8639908, located about 1,608 light-years (493 parsecs) (Note: Calculated from parallax of 2.0275 mas, using the formula $d \text{ (pc)} \approx 1 / p \text{ (arcsec)}.$) distant. It orbits the star very rapidly, with an orbital period of 0.91 days (22 hours), at a distance of just 0.0150 AU (2,240,000 km). This, along with its small mass, is causing it to evaporate and lose material, which leaves a comet-like tail of dust stretching from the planet.

== Physical properties ==
=== Dust tail ===
The most noteworthy characteristic of the planet is a tail of dust that follows it, spanning about a quarter of its orbit. The tail is formed from escaped material from the surface, much like that of a comet, providing a rare insight into the composition and formation of exoplanets. In the case of KOI-2700b, the tail most likely consists of fayalite (Fe_{2}SiO_{4}) and/or corundum (Al_{2}O_{3}). A composition of pure iron, graphite, or silicon carbide has been ruled out.

The tail leaves a distinct print on the light curves of the star. Specifically, the dips caused by the transiting planet change in depth from transit to transit, and are asymmetrical, first falling sharply and then recovering more gradually. In addition, the star appears to brighten slightly before transit, which can be explained by the dust grains causing forward scatter.

In addition to the dust tail, a cloud of partially ionized sodium vapor may surround the planet, extending to a size comparable to that of the host star (~0.54 R_{☉}).

=== Mass and radius ===
The precise mass and radius of the planet are unknown, but it is expected to be very small and rocky, as a mass of ≲0.03 M_{🜨} is required for the release of detectable amounts of dust, and in all likelihood, planets larger than roughly half the radius of Earth do not emit a dust tail whatsoever. Thus, the discovery paper points out that the modelled upper limits for the mass (0.86 M_{🜨}) and radius (1.06 R_{🜨}) are likely far larger than the actual values, and the planet may be closer to the Moon (0.27 R_{🜨}) in size. Indeed, further research indicates that its true radius likely lies somewhere between 0.1–0.3 R_{🜨}, smaller than Mercury (0.36 R_{🜨}).

The planet is losing mass at a roughly estimated rate of around 2 lunar masses (0.0246 M_{🜨}) per billion years, that is 6,000 metric tons per second, and not below 0.007 M_{🜨} per 1 Gyr.

== Host star ==
The planet orbits a faint 15th-magnitude star named KIC 8639908, which is located at right ascension 19^{h} 00^{m} 03.14^{s} and declination 40° 13′ 14.7″ (J2000), in the northern constellation of Lyra. It is currently in the main sequence with a spectral type of K5, a mass of 0.546 M_{☉}, and a radius of 0.540 R_{☉}. At an effective temperature of 4,296 K (4,023 °C; 7,273 °F), it radiates 8.9% the luminosity of the Sun from its photosphere. The star is very metal-poor, possessing a metallicity of −0.7, meaning it only has one-fifth the iron content of the Sun.

Similarities have been noted between it and Kepler-1520, a K4V-type star that hosts another disintegrating exoplanet with a comet-like tail.

== See also ==
- Catastrophically evaporating planet
- List of smallest exoplanets
- Ultra-short period planets
- Other disintegrating rocky planets with comet-like tails:
  - Kepler-1520b (KIC 12557548 b)
  - K2-22b (EPIC 201637175 b)
  - BD+05 4868Ab (TIC 466376085 b)
