= K2-137b =

Exoplanet in the constellation Virgo

Discovery
- Discovered by: Smith et al.
- Discovery site: Kepler Space Observatory
- Discovery date: November 2017 (accepted)
- Detection method: Transit method

Designations
- Alternative names: EPIC 228813918 b, UCAC4 420-056244 b, TIC 98720702 b, 2MASS J12272899-0611428 b

Orbital characteristics
- Semi-major axis: 0.0058±0.0006 AU
- Eccentricity: 0
- Orbital period (sidereal): 0.179715±0.000001 d
- Inclination: 89.6°±3.3°
- Star: K2-137

Physical characteristics
- Mean radius: 0.89±0.09 R_{🜨} or 0.64±0.10 R_{🜨}
- Mass: 1.01–2.80 M_{🜨}
- Temperature: 1471±47 K (1,198 °C; 2,188 °F, equilibrium)

K2-137b (also designated EPIC 228813918 b) is a hot, iron-rich, rocky exoplanet around the red dwarf K2-137 in the constellation Virgo about 99 parsecs (320 light-years) from Earth. It orbits the star very rapidly, with an orbital period of 0.1797 days (4.31 h), at a distance of just 0.0058 AU (870,000 km). It has received the Guinness World Record for the shortest orbital period for a confirmed planet, though the planetary candidate KOI-1843.03 has a period four minutes shorter.

== Physical properties ==
K2-137b is a sub-Earth in terms of radius. The discovery paper gives an estimate of 0.89±0.09 R_{🜨}, similar to Venus (0.949 R_{🜨}), whereas Adams et al. (2021) provides a smaller value of 0.64±0.10 R_{🜨}, slightly larger than Mars (0.532 R_{🜨}). If the latter is true, this would be one of the smallest exoplanets discovered so far. Despite the small size, it is somewhere between 1.01 and 2.80 times as massive as Earth, comparable to some super-Earths. Because it has yet to be disrupted by tidal forces from the host star, it can be inferred that iron makes up at least 42±5 % of its mass. Still, the planet is tidally stretched to an aspect ratio of between 1.21 and 1.66. Its equilibrium temperature is approximately 1,471 K (1,198 °C; 2,188 °F), hot enough to melt silicate minerals.

While K2-137b itself displays no signs of evaporation, such iron-rich USP planets may be higher-mass counterparts to disintegrating planets e.g., Kepler-1520b.

=== Host star ===
The planet orbits a red dwarf star, K2-137, with the spectral type M3V. Smith et al. (2018) gives it a mass of 0.463±0.052 M_{☉}, a radius of 0.442±0.044 R_{☉}, and an effective temperature of 3492±70 K, while Adams et al. (2021) presents a substantially smaller mass of 0.29±0.06 M_{☉} but a slightly hotter temperature of 3697±109 K.

== Formation ==
Several hypotheses exist as to how K2-137b became such an iron-rich, short-period planet. It could have been stripped of its outer silicate layers through high-velocity giant impacts, much like how Mercury came to have a high iron content according to several theories. Such collisions are projected to be common among USP planets due to high orbital speeds, reaching 270 km/s for K2-137b compared to the 29.8 km/s of Earth. On the other hand, it may have formed out of iron-rich material. Matter near the inner edge of the protoplanetary disk could be enriched in iron due to iron condensing at higher temperatures than enstatite and photophoresis separating iron grains from silicate grains by the difference in thermal conductivity. Finally, it is possible that the planet is situated at the Roche limit and has been slowly losing the silicate crust and mantle to Roche lobe overflow as its orbit slowly decays.

== See also ==
- K2-229b
