= TOI-2431 b =

Extrasolar planet orbiting TOI-2431

Discovery
- Discovered by: Taș et al.
- Discovery site: TESS
- Discovery date: 2026
- Detection method: Transit

Orbital characteristics
- Semi-major axis: 0.0063±0.0001 AU
- Eccentricity: 0
- Orbital period (sidereal): 0.22419577(7) days
- Inclination: 74±1

Physical characteristics
- Mean radius: 1.536±0.033 R_{🜨}
- Mass: 6.2±1.2 M_{🜨}
- Mean density: 9.4+1.9 −1.8 g/cm^{3}
- Temperature: 2,063±30 K

TOI-2431 b is an extrasolar planet orbiting the orange dwarf star TOI-2431. It was initially detected by the transit method in 2019, and with additional observations was confirmed in 2026. The planet is notable for its extremely short orbital period of 5h 22min, one of the shortest known. In about 31 million years, it will enter the Roche lobe of the host star and be torn apart.

== Characteristics ==
TOI-2431 b has around 1.54 times Earth's radius (R_{🜨}) and 6.2 times Earth's mass (M_{🜨}), resulting in a density of 9.2 g/cm^{3}, which is significantly higher than that of Earth and implies a rocky composition.

Its orbital period is extremely short, at just 0.224 days (5.4 hours), the sixth-shortest for any known exoplanet, as of 2025. The separation from the host star is 0.0063 astronomical units (940,000 kilometres), a constant value throughout the orbit, since its eccentricity is roughly zero. The separation is just 30% wider than the Roche lobe of the host star, and is decaying (shortening) at a rate that implies a remaining lifetime of about 31 million years before the planet enters the star's Roche lobe and is torn apart. This close orbit implies TOI-2431 b is tidally locked, with one side permanently facing the host star and the other side always facing it. It also implies a high irradiation, and hence a high temperature. Its equilibrium temperature is estimated at 2,063 K (1,790 °C), assuming a Bond albedo of 0. The elevated temperature imply its dayside is likely made up from molten lava.

Rocky planets at such orbital periods and high irradiances are expected to have an atmosphere made up from vapors of rock in the side always facing the host star. Such atmosphere can be detected with transmission spectroscopy using powerful telescopes such as the James Webb Space Telescope. Since TOI-2431 has a relatively bright apparent magnitude, TOI-2431 b has a high potential for the detection of such an atmosphere.

== Discovery ==
The planet was initially detected as a candidate in 2019 by the Transiting Exoplanet Survey Satellite and while a candidate, was briefly mentioned in a 2021 HST proposal and a 2022 study about the detection of an evaporating atmosphere made of rock vapor, owing its short orbital period and the feasibility of such a detection. It was confirmed in a 2026 study, using a joint of Transit photometry from the TESS and Doppler spectroscopy from the NEID and Habitable-zone Planet Finder (HPF) spectrographs, as well as imaging to secure the accuracy of the observations by ruling out potential artifacts from stars within field of view of the equipments.

== Host star ==
TOI-2431 (HIP 11707) is a K-type main-sequence star located in the constellation of Cetus. It is somewhat nearby to the Solar System, at a distance of 117.4 light-years (36.0 parsecs). The star has 0.66 times the mass of the Sun and 0.651 times the Sun's radius. It irradiates 10.9% of the Sun's luminosity from its photosphere at an effective temperature of 4,109 K, giving it an orange hue typical of K-type stars. The spectral type is K7V, the same of 61 Cygni B. Its apparent magnitude of 10.89 is below the threshold for naked eye vision.

== See also ==
- M62H b and PSR J1719−1438 b, exoplanets with the shortest known orbits.
- K2-137b
