= Catastrophically evaporating planet =

Type of exoplanet

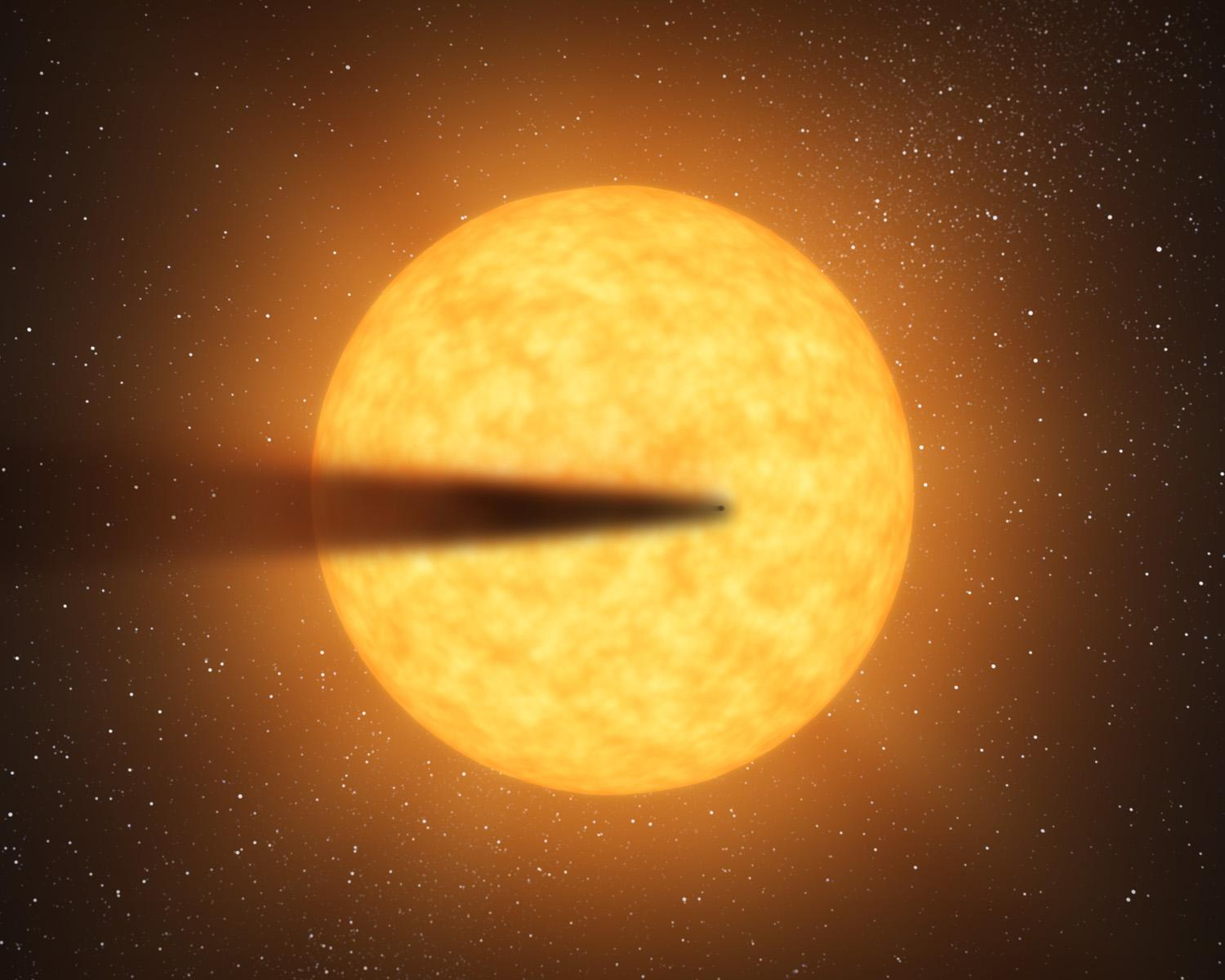
An artistic rendering of Kepler-1520b orbiting its host star. The planet is an example of a catastrophically evaporating planet.

A catastrophically evaporating planet or disintegrating planet is a stage in the evolution of some types of rocky planet in the final stage of their existence, as they evaporate away from high temperature caused by extreme proximity to their star and because of their low mass.

From observations of exoplanets, it has been noted that disintegrating planets usually form a comet-like tail on their orbit around a star. In the case of BD+05 4868Ab the planet also formed a leading tail in front of the path of the planet. Astronomers can study the transits to learn more about the geology of exoplanets, especially about the composition of the mantle and at later stages the core material. The evaporating material will recondense into minerals that can be different from mantle minerals. The composition of the tail can be determined by modelling the transits caused by the dust tail. For Kepler-1520b and K2-22b one work found magnesium-iron silicates fitting the transits well. The evaporating material can also be analysed via transmission spectroscopy. In the case of K2-22b, observations with JWST found magnesium silicate minerals, consistent with mantle material. The observations also showed an unexpected feature that could come from nitric oxide or carbon dioxide gases.

A 2024 model predicted that most catastrophically evaporating planets would be almost entirely solid, and that as a consequence the dust tail would consist of material from only a thin surface of the remaining planet at any given point. The iron core of an evaporating planet might survive for tens of billions of years with minimal evaporation, or its higher vapor pressure could cause it to evaporate more rapidly, reducing the time for which a core-material tail could be observed.

== See also ==
- KOI-2700b, another disintegrating planet
- Chthonian planet
