= Kepler-37 =

G-type main-sequence star in the constellation Lyra

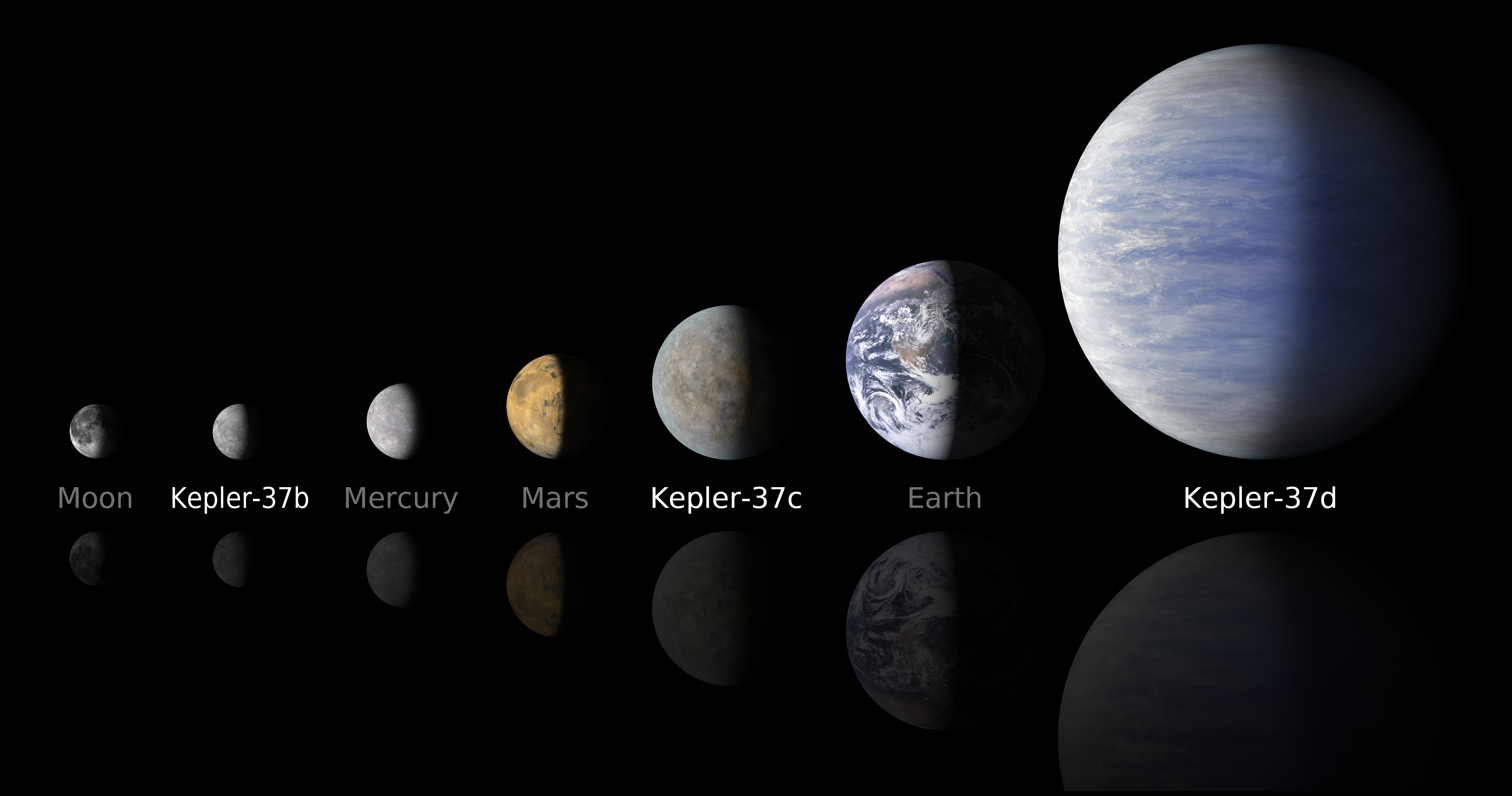
- Line up comparing the planets in the Kepler-37 system to the Moon and planets in the Solar System.

Observation data Epoch J2000 Equinox ICRS
- Constellation: Lyra
- Right ascension: 18^{h} 56^{m} 14.30760^{s}
- Declination: +44° 31′ 05.3896″
- Apparent magnitude (V): 9.710

Characteristics
- Evolutionary stage: main sequence
- Spectral type: G8V

Astrometry
Radial velocity (R_{v})	−30.92±0.20 km/s
Proper motion (μ)	RA: −60.396 mas/yr Dec.: 48.657 mas/yr
Parallax (π)	15.6253±0.0105 mas
Distance	208.7 ± 0.1 ly (64.00 ± 0.04 pc)

Details
Mass	0.79+0.033 −0.03 M_{☉}
Radius	0.789+0.0064 −0.0056 R_{☉}
Temperature	5357±68 K
Metallicity [Fe/H]	−0.36±0.05 dex
Rotational velocity (v sin i)	1.1 (± 1.1) km/s
Age	7.6+3.4 −3.1 Gyr

Other designations
- KOI-245, KIC 8478994, TYC 3131-1199-1, BD+44 3020, 2MASS J18561431+4431052, GSC 03131-01199, Gaia DR2 2106674071344722688

Database references
SIMBAD	data
Exoplanet Archive	data
KIC	data

Kepler-37, also known as UGA-1785, is a G-type main-sequence star located in the constellation Lyra 209 light-years (64 parsecs) from Earth. It is host to exoplanets Kepler-37b, Kepler-37c, Kepler-37d and possibly Kepler-37e, all of which orbit very close to it. Kepler-37 has a mass about 80.3 percent of the Sun's and a radius about 77 percent as large. It has a temperature similar to that of the Sun, but a bit cooler at 5,357 K. It has about half the metallicity of the Sun. With an age of roughly 6 billion years, it is slightly older than the Sun, but is still a main-sequence star. Until January 2015, Kepler-37 was the smallest star to be measured via asteroseismology.

== Planetary system ==
The Kepler-37 planetary system
Companion (in order from star)	Mass	Semimajor axis (AU)	Orbital period (days)	Eccentricity	Inclination (°)	Radius
b	<0.79 (Note: Masses more than a few times that of the Moon result in unphysically high densities.) M_{🜨}	0.1019±0.0014	13.367020(60)	<0.098	88.63+0.30 −0.53	0.3098+0.0059 −0.0076 R_{🜨}
c	<1.3 M_{🜨}	0.1390±0.0020	21.301848(18)	<0.099	89.07+0.19 −0.33	0.755+0.033 −0.055 R_{🜨}
d	<2.0 M_{🜨}	0.2109±0.0030	39.7922622(65)	<0.10	89.335+0.043 −0.047	2.030+0.030 −0.039 R_{🜨}
e (disputed)	≥8.1±1.7 M_{🜨}	0.25	50.25±0.15	—	—	~0.37 R_{🜨}

Kepler-37b is the closest planet to Kepler-37. At the time of its discovery in February 2013, it was the smallest known exoplanet. At 3,865 kilometres (2,402 mi) in diameter, it is slightly larger than the Moon. It orbits Kepler-37 once every 13 days at a distance of about 0.1 astronomical units (AU). Kepler-37b has a rocky surface and is believed to be too small and too close to its star to support water or maintain an atmosphere. Surface temperature is estimated at 700 K (427 °C; 800 °F).

Kepler-37c is around three-quarters of the diameter of Earth and orbits approximately every 21 days at a distance of just under 0.14 AU. Kepler-37d is about twice the diameter of Earth. It orbits in around 40 days at a distance of nearly 0.21 AU. Neither are able to support liquid water due to their proximity to Kepler-37.

A 2021 study detected Kepler-37d via radial velocity, finding a mass of about 5.4 M_{🜨}, but a 2023 study instead found an upper limit on its mass of only 2 M_{🜨}. In either case, it is not a rocky planet, but a low-density planet rich in volatiles. The periods of the three inner planets are close (within one per cent) to a 5:8:15 mean-motion resonance relationship.

In 2015, a grant was approved to further expand the Sagan Planet Walk by installing a Kepler-37d station on the Moon 384,500 kilometers (238,900 mi) away.

=== Discovery ===
The Kepler-37 planets were discovered in September 2012 with the aid of transit events detected by the Kepler space telescope, and announced to the public in February 2013. Computer simulation was used to rule out other astronomical phenomena mimicking planetary transits with probabilities of error <0.05% (3σ) for each potential planet. Additionally, simulation demonstrated that the proposed planetary configuration was stable. The exoplanets were considerably smaller than any previously detected, leading Science World Reports to state that "a major technological improvement for the telescope" had been achieved.

Thomas Barclay, an astrophysicist on the Kepler space telescope team, said the discovery was "really good news" in the search for hospitable planets, a prime objective of the project, because it demonstrated the telescope was capable of detecting Earth-sized planets. However, he does not anticipate finding many planets as small as Kepler-37b due to the very small amount of light such planets obscure. According to NASA scientist Jack Lissauer, the discovery of Kepler-37b "suggests such little planets are common, and more planetary wonders await as we continue to gather and analyze additional data." Astronomer John Johnson of Caltech university said the discovery would have been "unimaginable" a few years ago and that the telescope had revolutionized astronomers' picture of the universe.

The asteroseismology work was, in part, paid for by the Nonprofit Adopt a Star program operated by White Dwarf Research Corporation, a crowd funded non-profit organization.

In 2014, a fourth planet with an orbital period of 51 days (Kepler-37e) was reported based on transit-timing variations. Previously this signal was thought to be a false positive due to its low signal-to-noise ratio, and indeed later studies failed to detect either the transit or TTV signal. A study in 2021 again found that the TTV data disfavors the presence of planet e, and argued that it should be stripped of its "confirmed planet" status.

A 2023 study modeled the system both with and without a planet candidate at 51 days. Based on the assumption that a planet with a circular orbit of about 51 days is present, marginal radial velocity evidence was found for a sub-Neptune mass planet. Evidence of a longer-period planet candidate was also found. No additional planet has been confirmed, and the system remains with three confirmed planets.
