= Kepler-37c =

Terrestrial planet orbiting Kepler-37

Discovery
- Discovery site: Kepler space telescope
- Discovery date: 2013
- Detection method: Transit

Orbital characteristics
- Semi-major axis: 0.1390±0.0020 AU
- Eccentricity: <0.099
- Orbital period (sidereal): 21.301848(18) d
- Inclination: 89.07°+0.19° −0.33°
- Star: Kepler-37

Physical characteristics
- Mean radius: 0.755+0.033 −0.055 R_{🜨}
- Mass: <1.3 M_{🜨}
- Temperature: 615±9 K (342 °C; 647 °F, equilibrium)

Kepler-37c is an exoplanet discovered by the Kepler space telescope in February 2013. With an orbital period of 21 days, it is located 209 light-years away, in the constellation Lyra.

== Host star ==
The planet orbits a (G-type) star similar to the Sun, named Kepler-37, orbited by a total of four planets. The star has a mass of 0.80 M_{☉} and a radius of 0.79 R_{☉}. It has a temperature of, 5417 K and is 5.66 billion years old. In comparison, the Sun is 4.6 billion years old, and has a temperature of 5778 K.

The star's apparent magnitude, or how bright it appears from Earth's perspective, is 9.71. Therefore, it is too dim to be seen with the naked eye.

== See also ==
- List of planets discovered by the Kepler spacecraft
