= Kepler-37d =

Super-Earth orbiting Kepler-37

Discovery
- Discovery site: Kepler space telescope
- Discovery date: 2013
- Detection method: Transit

Orbital characteristics
- Semi-major axis: 0.2109±0.0030 AU
- Eccentricity: <0.10
- Orbital period (sidereal): 39.7922622(65) d
- Inclination: 89.335°+0.043° −0.047°
- Star: Kepler-37

Physical characteristics
- Mean radius: 2.030+0.030 −0.039 R_{🜨}
- Mass: 5.4±1.4 M_{🜨} or <2.0 M_{🜨}
- Mean density: 4.29+0.52 −0.74 g/cm^{3} or <1.3 g/cm^{3}
- Temperature: 499±7 K (226 °C; 439 °F, equilibrium)

Kepler-37d is an exoplanet discovered by the Kepler space telescope in February 2013. It is located 209 light years away, in the constellation Lyra. With an orbital period of 39.8 days, it is the largest of the three known planets orbiting its parent star Kepler-37.

A 2021 study detected Kepler-37d via radial velocity, finding a mass of about 5.4 M_{🜨}, but a 2023 study instead found an upper limit on its mass of only 2 M_{🜨}. In either case, it is not a rocky planet, but a low-density planet rich in volatiles.

In 2015, a grant was approved to further expand the Sagan Planet Walk by installing a Kepler-37d station on the Moon 384,500 kilometers (238,900 mi) away.

== Host star ==
The planet orbits a (G-type) star similar to the Sun, named Kepler-37, orbited by a total of four planets. The star has a mass of 0.80 M_{☉} and a radius of 0.79 R_{☉}. It has a temperature of 5417 K and is 5.66 billion years old. In comparison, the Sun is 4.6 billion years old, and has a temperature of 5778 K.

The star's apparent magnitude, or how bright it appears from Earth's perspective, is 9.71. Therefore, it is too dim to be seen with the naked eye.

== See also ==
- List of planets discovered by the Kepler spacecraft
