= Kepler-1520 =

K-type main sequence star in the constellation Cygnus

Observation data Epoch J2000 Equinox ICRS
- Constellation: Cygnus
- Right ascension: 19^{h} 23^{m} 51.8899^{s}
- Declination: +51° 30′ 16.983″
- Apparent magnitude (V): 16.7

Characteristics
- Evolutionary stage: Main sequence
- Spectral type: K4V
- Apparent magnitude (J): 14.021±0.035
- Apparent magnitude (H): 13.433±0.035
- Apparent magnitude (K): 13.319±0.035

Astrometry
Proper motion (μ)	RA: +0.312(36) mas/yr Dec.: +11.156(30) mas/yr
Parallax (π)	1.7034±0.0242 mas
Distance	1,910 ± 30 ly (587 ± 8 pc)
Absolute magnitude (M_{V})	7.6

Details
Mass	0.76±0.03 M_{☉}
Radius	0.71±0.026 R_{☉}
Luminosity	0.14 L_{☉}
Surface gravity (log g)	4.610+0.018 −0.031 cgs
Temperature	4,677+82 −71 K
Metallicity [Fe/H]	0.04±0.15 dex
Rotation	22.91±0.24 d
Age	4.47 Gyr

Other designations
- KIC 12557548, 2MASS J19235189+5130170, Gaia DR2 2136216647412563840

Database references
SIMBAD	data
KIC	data

Kepler-1520 (initially published as KIC 12557548) is a K-type main-sequence star located in the constellation Cygnus. The star is particularly important, as measurements taken by the Kepler spacecraft indicate that the variations in the star's light curve cover a range from about 0.2% to 1.3% of the star's light being blocked. This indicates that there may be a rapidly disintegrating planet, a prediction not yet conclusively confirmed, in orbit around the star, losing mass at a rate of 1 Earth mass every billion years. The planet itself is about 0.1 Earth masses, or just twice the mass of Mercury, and is expected to disintegrate in about 100-200 million years. The planet orbits its star in just 15.7 hours, at a distance only two stellar diameters away from the star's surface, and has an estimated effective temperature of about 2255 K. The orbital period of the planet is one of the shortest ever detected in the history of the extrasolar planet search. In 2016, the planet was confirmed as part of a data release by the Kepler spacecraft.

== Nomenclature and history ==
Prior to Kepler observation, Kepler-1520 had the 2MASS catalogue number 2MASS J19235189+5130170. In the Kepler Input Catalog it has the designation of KIC 12557548, and when it was found to have transiting planet candidates it was given the Kepler object of interest number of KOI-3794.

The star's planetary companion were discovered by NASA's Kepler Mission, a mission tasked with discovering planets in transit around their stars. The transit method that Kepler uses involves detecting dips in brightness in stars. These dips in brightness can be interpreted as planets whose orbits move in front of their stars from the perspective of Earth. The name Kepler-1520 derives directly from the fact that the star is the catalogued 1,520th star discovered by Kepler to have confirmed planets.

The designation b, derive from the order of discovery. The designation of b is given to the first planet orbiting a given star, followed by the other lowercase letters of the alphabet. In the case of Kepler-1520, there was only one planet detected, so only the letter b is used.

== Stellar characteristics ==
Kepler-1520 is a K-type star that is approximately 76% the mass of and 71% the radius of the Sun. It has a surface temperature of 4,677 K and is about 4.47 billion years old. In comparison, the Sun is about 4.6 billion years old and has a surface temperature of 5,778 K.

The star's apparent magnitude, or how bright it appears from Earth's perspective, is 15. Therefore, it is too dim to be seen with the naked eye.

== Planetary system ==
The Kepler-1520 planetary system
Companion (in order from star)	Mass	Semimajor axis (AU)	Orbital period (days)	Eccentricity	Inclination (°)	Radius
b	<0.02 M_{🜨}	0.013 (1208425.494 miles)	0.6535538±0.0000001	~0	—	<1 R_{🜨}

The planetary system of Kepler-1520 consists of one extrasolar planet, named Kepler-1520b. This planet may possess a tail of dust and gas formed in a similar fashion to that of a comet but, as opposed to the tail of a comet, containing molecules of pyroxene and aluminium(III) oxide. Based on the rate at which the particles in the tail are emitted, the mass of the planet has been constrained to less than 0.02 Earth masses — a higher-mass planet would have too much gravity to sustain the observed rate of mass loss.

Simulations show that the density of dust falls off rapidly with increasing distance from the planet. Calculations conducted by Rappaport et al. show that the dust tail, in addition to absorbing light directly, may scatter some of the light which reaches it, contributing to a small apparent rise in stellar flux before the planet and its tail pass in front of the star, and a small apparent reduction in the stellar flux as the planet exits the plane of the stellar disk.
