= Saul Rappaport =

American physics professor

Saul Rappaport is a professor emeritus of physics at the Massachusetts Institute of Technology. Rappaport became assistant professor in the MIT Department of Physics in 1969 and became a full professor in 1981. From 1993 to 1995, he was head of the Astrophysics Division.

He received his A.B. from Temple University in 1963 and his Ph.D. from MIT in 1968.

His main research interest is in binary systems containing collapsed stars—white dwarfs, neutron stars (including pulsars), and black holes. He has authored numerous papers regarding the discovery of astronomical phenomena, such as the discovery of transiting exocomets and the discovery of a quadruple star system containing two strongly interacting eclipsing binaries.

He was elected a Fellow of the American Physical Society in 1989 "for major contributions to our understanding of the evolution of binary stellar systems containing a compact member and for the determination of the masses of neutron stars"

== Selected publications ==
Some of his publications in the Astrophysical Journal, one of the major astrophysics journals, are:

- "A New Technique for Calculations of Binary Stellar Evolution, with Application to Magnetic Braking Rappaport S, et al. Astrophysical Journal 275 (2): 713-731 1983.
- "On the Evolutionary Status of Bright, Low-Mass X-ray Sources," Webrink, RF, Rappaport S, Savonije GJ, Astrophysical Journal 270 (2): 678-693 1983.
- "The Evolution of Highly Compact Binary Stellar-Systems," Rappaport S, et al. Astrophysical Journal 254 (2): 616-640 1982.
- "Formation and Evolution of Luminous Supersoft X-ray Sources," Rappaport S, et al. Astrophysical Journal 426 (2): 692-703 Part 1 May 10, 1994.
- "The Rings Around the Egg Nebula," Harpaz A, Rappaport S, Soker N, Astrophysical Journal 487 (2): 809-817 Part 1 Oct 1 1997.
- "Collisions of Free-floating Planets with Evolved Stars in Globular Clusters," Soker N, Rappaport S, Fregeau J, Astrophysical Journal 563 (1): L87-L90 Part 2 DEC 10 2001.
