= Lava planet =

Terrestrial planet with the surface covered by molten lava

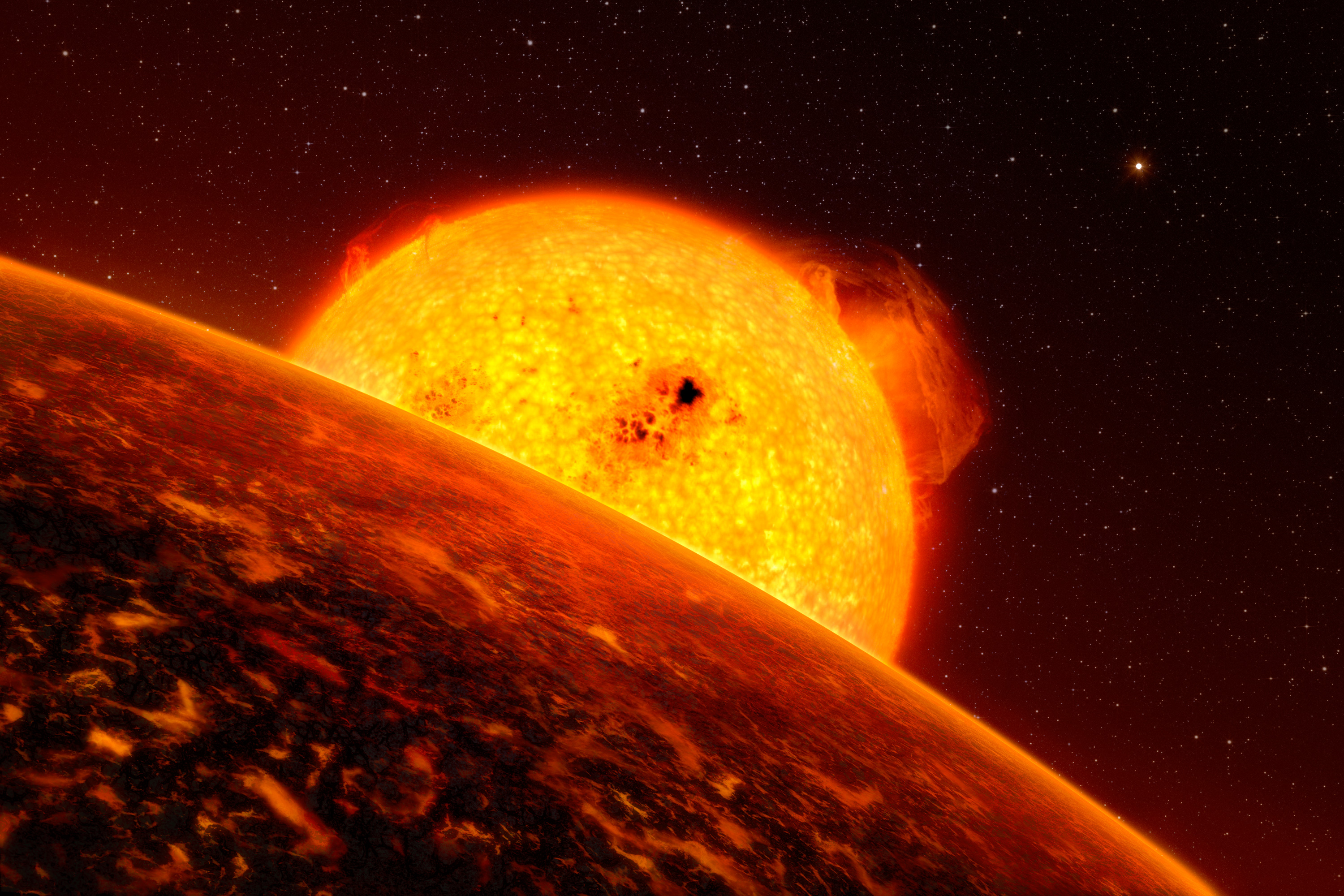
Artist's impression of CoRoT-7b, likely a lava exoplanet

A lava planet is a type of terrestrial planet whose planetary surface is mostly or entirely covered by magma oceans or pools of erupted lava. Situations where such planets could exist include a young terrestrial planet just after its formation, a planet that has recently suffered a large crust-splitting impact event, or a planet orbiting very close to its star causing intense irradiation and tidal forces to melt its surface.

== Factors and characteristics ==
Lava planets would probably orbit extremely close to their parent star. In planets with eccentric orbits, the gravity from the nearby star would distort the planet periodically, with the resulting friction producing internal heat. This tidal heating could melt rocks into magma, which would then erupt through volcanoes. This would be similar to the Solar System moon Io, orbiting close to its parent Jupiter. Io is the most geologically active world in the Solar System, with hundreds of volcanic centres and extensive lava flows. Lava worlds orbiting extremely closely to the parent star may possibly have even more volcanic activity than Io, leading some astronomers to use the term super-Io. These "super-Io" exoplanets may resemble Io with extensive sulfur concentrated on their surfaces that is associated with the continuous active volcanism.

However, tidal heating is not the only factor shaping a lava planet. In addition to tidal heating from orbiting close to their parent star, the intense stellar irradiation could melt the surface crust directly into lava. The entire star-facing surface of a tidally locked planet could be left covered in a lava ocean while the nightside may have lava lakes, or even lava rain caused by the condensation of vaporized rock from the dayside. The mass of the planet would also be a factor. The appearance of plate tectonics on terrestrial planets is related to planetary mass, with more massive planets than Earth expected to exhibit plate tectonics and thus more intense volcanic activity. Also, a Mega Earth may retain so much internal heat from its formation that a solid crust cannot form.

Protoplanets tend to have intense volcanic activity resulting from large amounts of internal heating just after formation, even relatively small planets that orbit far from their parent stars. Lava planets can also result from giant impacts; Earth was briefly a lava planet after being impacted by a Mars-sized body which formed the Moon.

A 2020 preprint study finds that lava planets have low geometric albedos of around 0.1 and that molten lava on the surface can cool and harden to form quenched glass.

== Candidates ==
There are no known lava worlds in the Solar System. But several known exoplanets are likely lava worlds, given their small enough masses, sizes, and orbits. Likely lava exoplanets include CoRoT-7b, Kepler-10b,, K2-141b, Kepler-78b, TOI-2431 b, TOI-561 b, 55 Cancri e, K2-141 b, and TOI-1444 b

== See also ==
- Chthonian planet
- List of planet types
- Magma ocean
