= K2-22b =

Extrasolar planet

Discovery
- Discovery site: Kepler Space Observatory
- Discovery date: 2015
- Detection method: Transit

Orbital characteristics
- Semi-major axis: 0.0088 AU (1,320,000 km)
- Eccentricity: null
- Orbital period (sidereal): 0.381078 d
- Inclination: null
- Star: K2-22

Physical characteristics
- Mean radius: <0.71R_{🜨}
- Mass: 0.02 M_{🜨}
- Temperature: 2,100 K (1,830 °C; 3,320 °F)

Atmosphere
- Composition by volume: dusty tail: magnesium silicate, NO and/or CO_{2}

K2-22b (also known as EPIC 201637175 b) is an exoplanet 801 ly from Earth, rapidly orbiting the red dwarf K2-22 with an orbital period of 9.145872 hours. It has a mass of 0.02 M_{🜨} and a radius below 0.71 R_{🜨}. The planet was not detected in the K2 photometry. K2 photometry reveals the presence of an anomalous light curve consistent with evaporation of dust from the planet. This dust forms a tail both ahead and behind the planet, similar to some comets in the Solar System. The evaporation of this dust requires a low surface gravity from the host planet, implying it is a low mass, "Mars, Mercury, or even lunar sized bodies with surface gravities of 1/6 to 1/3 that of Earth are to be preferred."

The survey in 2020 has failed to validate the existence of the planet, although did not claim it to be a false positive. The observation of planetary system in 2021 has failed to detect the planet itself, placing an upper limit of 0.71R_{🜨} on its size. With the observed mass loss rate, the probable planet mass is 0.02M_{🜨}, and the planet will be gone in 21 million years in future. Ground-based observations detected the transits in 2016/2017. Faulkes Telescope North/MuSCAT observations detected 7 predicted transits in 2021/2022. This observation showed a decline of transit depth since discovery. This could be due to a magnetic cycle of the host star, or the overturn of the magma ocean. This could mean that the transit activity will increase again in the future.

In April 2024 the evaporated material was observed with JWST MIRI in transmission spectroscopy. The observation was done using low-resolution slitless spectroscopy to observe four transits. The transit depth varies over time between 0% and 1.3%, so not every transit was detected. One transit was detected with high significance and two others were detected with low significance. The researchers also observed the transits with CHEOPS. Only the 4th and most significant transit was unobstructed by the earth. The data is consistent with some kind of magnesium silicate minerals. Earth's mantle is rich in magnesium-rich silicates, with relative little iron. The evaporating minerals could condense into enstatite (MgSiO_{3}) or forsterite (Mg_{2}SiO_{4}). An earlier work did however find that the modelling of the transits agree with magnesium-iron silicates (olivine and pyroxene). While the single JWST spectrum cannot distinguish between minerals, it can at least exclude iron-rich planetary core material. The spectrum also shows an unexpected feature at 5 μm, which could be the from gases, possibly NO or CO_{2}. The origin of these gases is not clear and additional observations are needed to confirm this signal. Two geophysical scenarios are suggested. In one situation the gases originate from an evaporating deep ocean, containing clathrate hydrates of N_{2}, NH_{3} and CO_{2}. In the other situation the molecules N_{2}, CO_{2}, and H_{2}O degas from a magma ocean. Some of these gases are then turned into NO by photodissociation, collisional dissociation, or gas-phase chemistry.

== See also ==
- Catastrophically evaporating planet
- List of exoplanet extremes
- Other disintegrating rocky planets with comet-like tails:
  - Kepler-1520b
  - KOI-2700b
  - BD+05 4868
