= USNO CCD Astrograph Catalog =

Astronomical catalog

First USNO CCD Astrograph Catalog
- Alternative names: UCAC

The USNO CCD Astrograph Catalog (UCAC) is an astrometric star catalog of the United States Naval Observatory.

Edition	Description
UCAC-1	The first preliminary edition, published in March 2000, gives the positions and proper motions of over 27 million stars in the southern hemisphere in the brightness range 8–16.
UCAC-2	The second issue was the IAU published General Assembly in Sydney (2003) and includes positions and proper motions of about 50 million stars.
UCAC-3	The third edition was published in the IAU General Assembly in Rio (August 2009).
UCAC-4	The fourth edition was published in August 2012. Since Spring 2015, the successor URAT is available.
UCAC-5	The fifth edition was published in February 2017.
