= Magma ocean =

Large area of molten rock on the surface of a planet

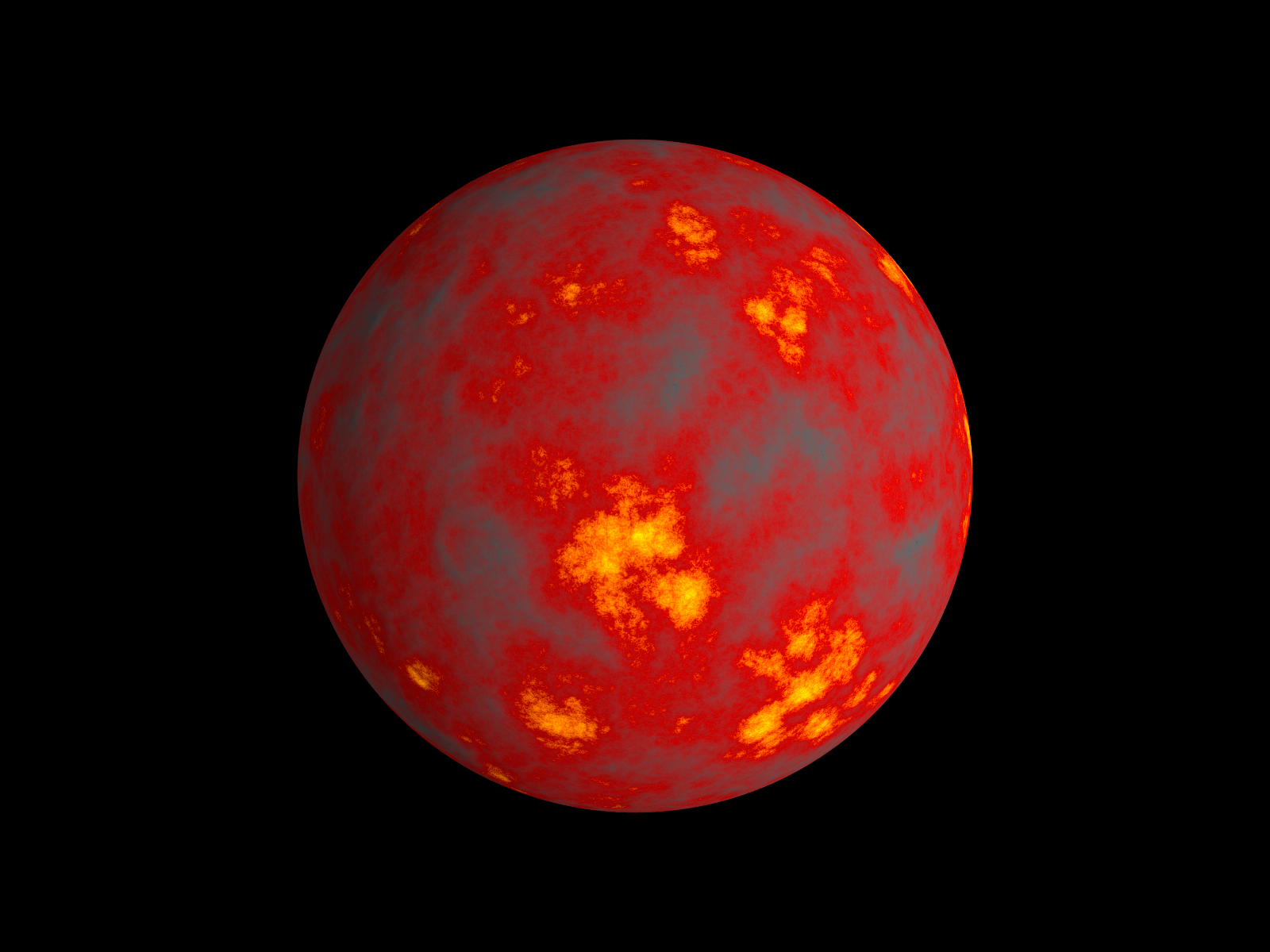
Full volcanic planet, magma ocean in surface

Magma oceans are vast fields of surface magma that exist during periods of a planet's or some natural satellite's accretion when the celestial body is completely or partly molten.

In the early Solar System, magma oceans were formed by the melting of planetesimals and planetary impacts. Small planetesimals are melted by the heat provided by the radioactive decay of aluminium-26. As planets grew larger, the energy was then supplied from giant impacts with other planetary bodies. Magma oceans are integral parts of planetary formation as they facilitate the formation of a core through metal segregation and an atmosphere and hydrosphere through degassing. Evidence exists to support the existence of magma oceans on both the Earth and the Moon. Magma oceans may survive for millions to tens of millions of years, interspersed by relatively mild conditions.

== Magma ocean heat sources ==
The sources of the energy required for the formation of magma oceans in the early solar system were the radioactive decay of aluminium-26, accretionary impacts, and core formation. The abundance and short half life of aluminium-26 allowed it to function as one of the sources of heat for the melting of planetesimals. With aluminium-26 as a heat source, planetesimals that had accreted within 2 Ma after the formation of the first solids in the solar system could melt. Melting in the planetesimals began in the interior and the interior magma ocean transported heat via convection. Planetesimals larger than 20 km in radius that accreted within 2 Ma are expected to have melted, although not completely.

The kinetic energy provided by accretionary impacts and the loss of potential energy from a planet during core formation are also large heat sources for planet melting. Core formation, also referred to as metal-silicate differentiation, is the separation of metallic components from silicate in the magma that sink to form a planetary core. Accretionary impacts that produce heat for the melting of planet embryos and large terrestrial planets have an estimated timescale of tens to hundreds of millions of years. An example would be the Moon-forming impact on Earth, that is thought to have formed a magma ocean with a depth of up to 2000 km. The energy of accretionary impacts foremost melt the exterior of the planetary body, and the potential energy provided by core differentiation and the sinking of metals melts the interior.

== Lunar magma ocean ==
The formation of the lunar magma ocean which was a layer of molten rock believed to measure hundreds of kilometers in depth.

The findings of the Apollo missions were the first articles of evidence to suggest the existence of a magma ocean on the Moon. The rocks in the samples acquired from the missions were found to be composed of a mineral called anorthite. Anorthite consists mostly of a variety of plagioclase feldspars, which are lower in density than magma. This discovery gave rise to the hypothesis that the rocks formed through an ascension to the surface of a magma ocean during the early life stages of the Moon. Additional evidence for the existence of the Lunar Magma Ocean includes the sources of mare basalts and KREEP (K for potassium, REE for rare-earth elements, and P for phosphorus). The existence of these components within the mostly anorthositic crust of the Moon are synonymous with the solidification of the Lunar Magma Ocean. Furthermore, the abundance of the trace element europium within the Moon's crust suggests that it was absorbed from the magma ocean, leaving europium deficits in the mare basalt rock sources of the Moon's crust. The lunar magma ocean was initially 200-300 km thick and the magma achieved a temperature of about 2000 K. After the early stages of the Moon's accretion, the magma ocean was subjected to cooling caused by convection in the Moon's interior.

== Earth's magma ocean ==
During its formation, the Earth likely featured a series of magma oceans resulting from giant impacts, the final one being the Moon-forming impact. The best chemical evidence for the existence of magma oceans on Earth is the abundance of certain siderophile elements in the mantle that record magma ocean depths of approximately 1000 km during accretion. The scientific evidence to support the existence of magma oceans on early Earth is not as developed as the evidence for the Moon because of the recycling of the Earth's crust and mixing of the mantle. Unlike Earth, indications of a magma ocean on the Moon such as the flotation crust, elemental components in rocks, and KREEP have been preserved throughout its lifetime.

Today Earth's outer core is a liquid layer about 2,260 km (1,400 mi) thick, composed mostly of molten iron and molten nickel that lies above Earth's solid inner core and below its mantle. This layer may be considered as an ocean of molten iron and nickel inside Earth.

== See also ==
- Lava planet – hypothetical type of planet with a surface dominated by molten rock
- Hadean
- Chondrite
- Planetary differentiation
