= Neptunian exoplanet =

Type of exoplanet

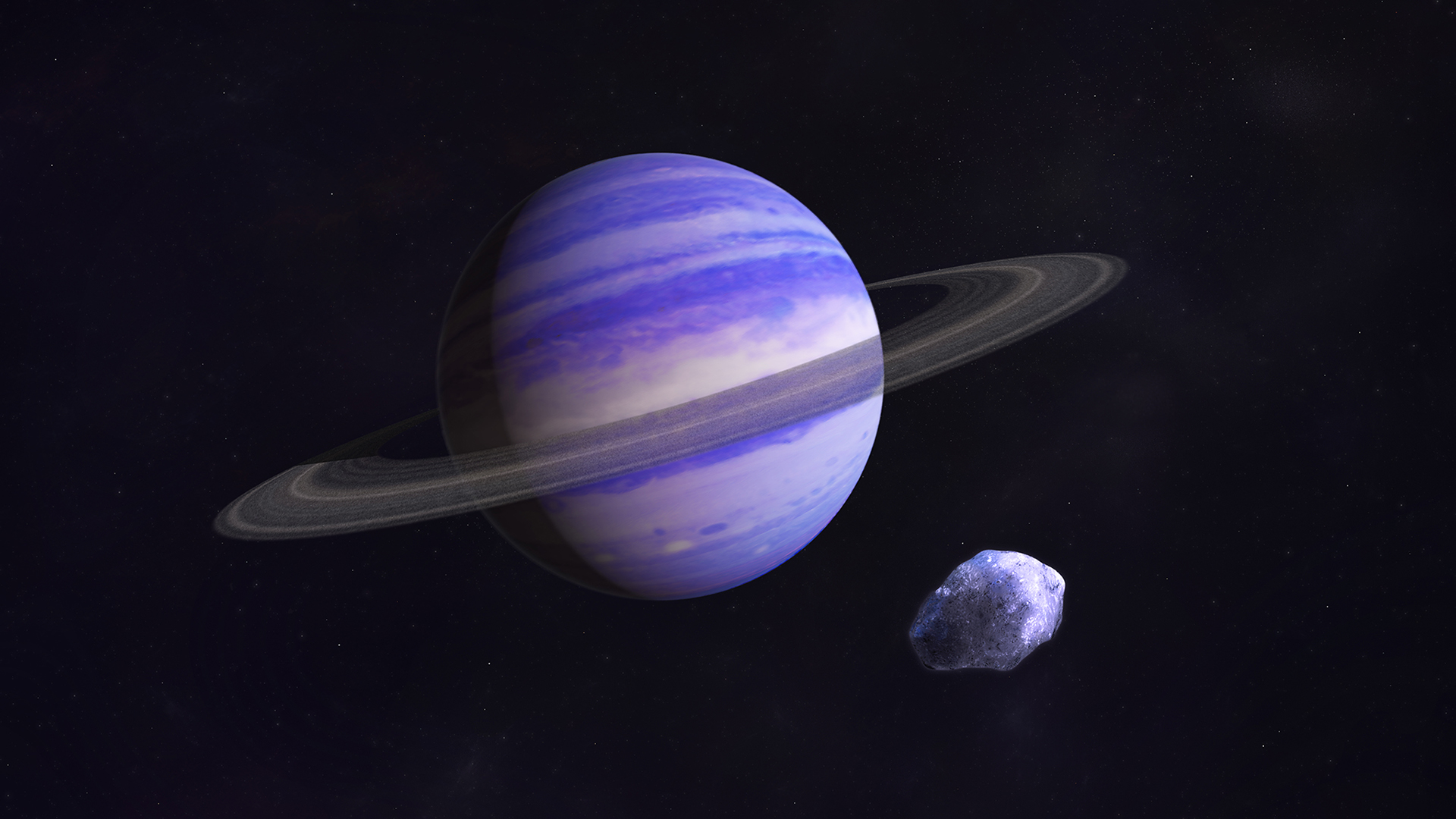
A ringed Exo-Neptune.

Neptunian exoplanets are a class of exoplanets that are similar in size to the ice giants Neptune and Uranus in the Solar System. Neptunian exoplanets may have a mixture of interiors though all would be rocky with heavier metals at their cores. Neptunian planets typically have hydrogen- and helium-dominated atmospheres.

There are several recognized subtypes of Neptunian exoplanets:

- Hot Neptune – orbiting close to its star
- Helium planet – a hypothetical type that can form from hot Neptune via hydrogen evaporation, leaving a helium-dominated atmosphere
- Mini-Neptune – considerably smaller than Neptune but still having a thick hydrogen-helium envelope, relatively common
- Super-puff – inflated planets with unusually low mean density
- Hycean planet – a hypothetical transitional type to ocean planets with a thin, hydrogen-helium-dominated atmosphere overlaying a liquid water ocean

== List of Neptunian exoplanets ==
=== Kepler ===
- Kepler-56b
- Kepler-102e

=== GJ ===
- GJ 436b

=== TOI ===
- TOI-421c
- TOI-532b
- TOI-824b
- TOI-1231b
- TOI-2374b
- TOI-4010b
- TOI-4010c
- TOI-4010d

=== LTT ===
- LTT 9779b

=== HAT ===
- HAT-P-26b
- HAT-P-11b

=== OGLE ===
- OGLE-2005-BLG-169Lb
- OGLE-2005-BLG-390Lb

=== Other ===
- Mu Arae c- first hot Neptune discovered
- NGTS-4b
- NGTS-14Ab
- KMT-2017-BLG-0165Lb
