= WASP-166 =

Star in the constellation Hydra

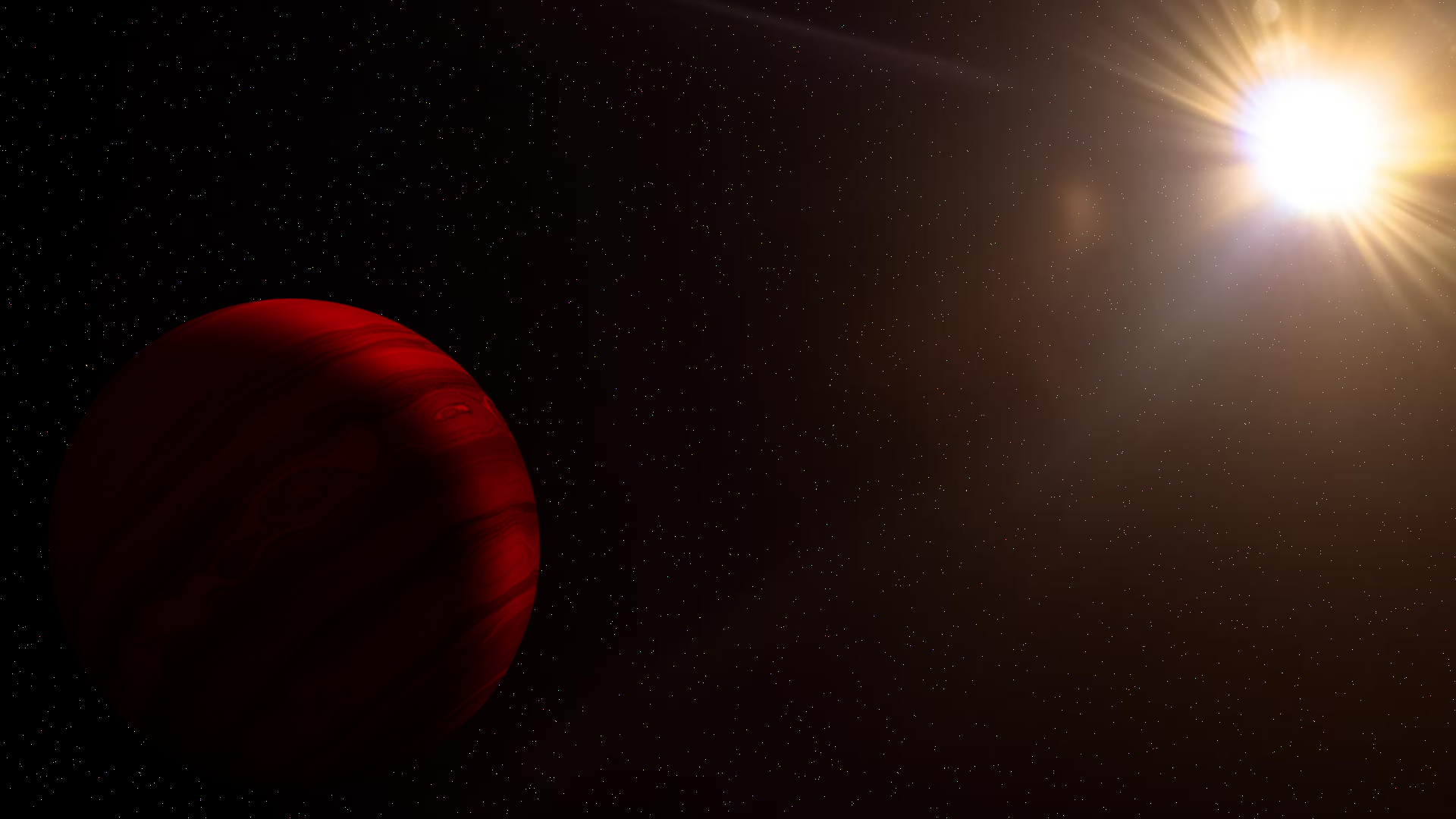
- Artist's impression of WASP-166 and its planet

Observation data Epoch J2000 Equinox ICRS
- Constellation: Hydra
- Right ascension: 09^{h} 39^{m} 30.08611^{s}
- Declination: −20° 58′ 56.8813″
- Apparent magnitude (V): 9.35

Characteristics
- Evolutionary stage: main sequence
- Spectral type: F9V

Astrometry
Radial velocity (R_{v})	23.49±0.24 km/s
Proper motion (μ)	RA: -55.101 mas/yr Dec.: +11.152 mas/yr
Parallax (π)	8.7523±0.0141 mas
Distance	372.7 ± 0.6 ly (114.3 ± 0.2 pc)

Details
Mass	1.19±0.06 M_{☉}
Radius	1.22±0.06 R_{☉}
Luminosity	1.86 L_{☉}
Surface gravity (log g)	4.34±0.05 cgs
Temperature	6,050±50 K
Metallicity [Fe/H]	+0.19±0.05 dex
Rotation	12.1±0.9 d
Rotational velocity (v sin i)	4.6±0.8 km/s
Age	2.1±0.9 Gyr

Other designations
- Filetdor, BD−20 2976, TOI-576, TIC 408310006, WASP-166, TYC 6055-537-1

Database references
SIMBAD	data
Exoplanet Archive	data

WASP-166, also named Filetdor, is an F-type main-sequence star 373 light-years (114 parsecs) away in the constellation Hydra. With an apparent magnitude of 9.4, it is too faint to be visible to the naked eye. It hosts one known exoplanet.

== Nomenclature ==
The designation WASP-166 comes from the Wide Angle Search for Planets.

This was one of the 20 systems selected to be named in the third NameExoWorlds campaign, beginning in August 2022. The approved names, proposed by a team from Spain, were announced in June 2023. The star is named Filetdor and its planet is named Catalineta, after characters from a Mallorcan folktale about a golden sea serpent, Na Filet d'Or.

== Planetary system ==
The planet WASP-166b, later named Catalineta, is a hot, low-density super-Neptune, discovered in 2018 using the transit method as part of the Wide Angle Search for Planets. It is a rare example of a planet within the Neptune desert; few Neptune-mass planets are found so close to their stars.

The orbit of WASP-166b is aligned with its host star's equator, differing from other similar hot Neptunes (such as HAT-P-11b, WASP-107b and GJ 436 b) which have misaligned orbits. The aligned orbit suggests that it is unlikely to have undergone high-eccentricity migration.

While initial transmission spectroscopy observations of WASP-166b with the HARPS spectrograph failed to detect any molecules in the planet's atmosphere, follow-up studies of the same dataset and of ESPRESSO data have detected sodium in the atmosphere. ESPRESSO has also been used to place constraints on the possible presence of water vapor and clouds.

The WASP-166 planetary system
Companion (in order from star)	Mass	Semimajor axis (AU)	Orbital period (days)	Eccentricity	Inclination (°)	Radius
b / Catalineta	0.101±0.005 M_{J}	0.0641±0.0011	5.443540(4)	<0.07	88.0±0.7	0.63±0.03 R_{J}

== See also ==
- LTT 9779
