= LTT 9779 =

Star in the constellation Sculptor

LTT 9779 / Uúba
Observation data Epoch J2000 Equinox ICRS
- Constellation: Sculptor
- Right ascension: 23^{h} 54^{m} 40.20731^{s}
- Declination: −37° 37′ 40.5244″
- Apparent magnitude (V): 9.76±0.03

Characteristics
- Evolutionary stage: Main sequence
- Spectral type: G7V
- Apparent magnitude (B): 10.55±0.04
- Apparent magnitude (V): 9.76±0.03
- Apparent magnitude (G): 9.606±0.003
- Apparent magnitude (J): 8.45±0.02
- Apparent magnitude (H): 8.15±0.02
- Apparent magnitude (K): 8.02±0.03

Astrometry
| Radial velocity (R_{v}) | −10.72±0.22 km/s |
| Proper motion (μ) | RA: 247.634 mas/yr Dec.: −69.752 mas/yr |
| Parallax (π) | 12.3381±0.0166 mas |
| Distance | 264.3 ± 0.4 ly (81.0 ± 0.1 pc) |
| Absolute magnitude (M_{V}) | 5.30±0.07 |

Details
| Mass | 1.00+0.02 −0.03 M_{☉} |
| Radius | 0.949±0.006 R_{☉} |
| Luminosity (bolometric) | 0.71±0.01 L_{☉} |
| Surface gravity (log g) | 4.51±0.01 cgs |
| Temperature | 5443+14 −13 K |
| Metallicity [Fe/H] | 0.27±0.03 dex |
| Rotation | ≤45 d |
| Rotational velocity (v sin i) | 1.06±0.37 km/s |
| Age | 1.9+1.7 −1.2 Gyr |

Other designations
- Uúba, CD−38 15670, CPD−38 8578, HIP 117883, SAO 214854, PPM 304331, LTT 9779, NLTT 58368, TOI-193, TIC 183985250, TYC 8015-1162-1, 2MASS J23544020-3737408, WISEA J235440.43-373741.2

Database references
| SIMBAD | data |
| Exoplanet Archive | data |

LTT 9779, also named Uúba, is a G-type main-sequence star located 264 light-years (81 parsecs) away from the Solar System in the constellation of Sculptor. The star is about 95% the radius and about the same mass as the Sun, but younger than the Sun at 1.7 billion years old, hence its lower luminosity (about 0.7 L_{☉}). It has a temperature of 5,443 K (5,170 °C; 9,338 °F) and a rotation period of 45 days. LTT 9779 is orbited by one known exoplanet, LTT 9779 b.

== Nomenclature ==
The designation LTT 9779 comes from one of Luyten's catalogues of stars with high proper motion.

In August 2022, this planetary system was included among 20 systems to be named by the third NameExoWorlds project. The approved names, proposed by a team from Colombia, were announced in June 2023. LTT 9779 is named Uúba and its planet is named Cuancoá, after the U'wa language word referring to "stars", "seeds", or "eyes" and the name for the morning star, respectively.

== Planetary system ==
The discovery of the exoplanet LTT 9779 b using TESS was published in 2020. It is an ultra-hot Neptune with about 29 times the mass and 4.7 times the radius of Earth and an orbital period of less than a day. These parameters make it one of the very few known planets in the Neptunian desert. Observations using the Spitzer Space Telescope have measured the planet's dayside temperature at 2,305 K (2,032 °C; 3,689 °F), and observations by CHEOPS have shown the planet to be highly reflective, with an albedo of 80%.

A study published in 2019, prior to the confirmation of LTT 9779 b, proposed a second candidate planet in the system based on transit timing variations, but this has not been confirmed, and the study that confirmed LTT 9779 b found no evidence of transit timing variations.

The LTT 9779 planetary system
| Companion (in order from star) | Mass | Semimajor axis (AU) | Orbital period (days) | Eccentricity | Inclination (°) | Radius |
|---|---|---|---|---|---|---|
| b / Cuancoá | 29.32+0.78 −0.81 M_{🜨} | 0.01679+0.00014 −0.00012 | 0.7920520±0.0000093 | <0.01 | 76.39±0.43 | 4.72±0.23 R_{🜨} |

== See also ==
- WASP-166
