= Hot giant =

A hot giant is any of three types of giant planet in other planetary systems:

- Hot Jupiters, Jupiter-like gas giants that orbit close to their stars.
- Hot Neptunes, Neptune-like gas giants that orbit close to their stars.
