= NGTS-3Ab =

Giant exoplanet in the constellation Columba

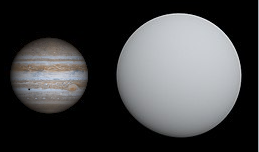
- NGTS-3Ab compared to Jupiter

Discovery
- Discovered by: Günther et al.
- Discovery date: 07 May 2018
- Detection method: Transit

Orbital characteristics
- Semi-major axis: 0.023+0.007 −0.005 AU
- Orbital period (sidereal): 1.67±0.00 d
- Inclination: 89.56°+0.31° −0.48°
- Time of perihelion: 2,457,620.16790±0.00095 d
- Semi-amplitude: −404±35 m/s
- Star: NGTS-3

Physical characteristics
- Mean radius: 1.48±0.37 R_{J}
- Mass: 2.38±0.26 M_{J}
- Mean density: 0.31+0.41 −0.15 g/cm^{3}

NGTS-3Ab is a gas giant exoplanet that orbits a G-type star. Its mass is 2.38 Jupiters, it takes 1.7 days to complete one orbit of its star, and is 0.023 AU from its star. Its discovery was announced in 2018. The Jupiter-like planet is discovered by 39 astronomers, mainly Max Günther, Didier Queloz, Edward Gillen, Laetitia Delrez, and Francois Bouchy.

== Overview ==
NGTS-3Ab was discovered in 2018 by the use of transit method. It is the only planet orbiting around NGTS-3A, a G6V class star, situated in the constellation of Columba in 2480 light years from the Sun. The exoplanet orbits its star in about 2 terrestrial days. The orbit is closer to the star than the internal limit of the habitable zone. It has a low density and can be composed of gas. It has a low Earth similarity index (0.06) and should be very different from our planet.

== Discovery ==
The discovery of NGTS-3Ab, a hot Jupiter found orbiting a star in a still visually unresolved binary system, was announced in June 2018. The data regarding the exoplanet is based on the data gathered with the Next Generation Transit Survey (NGTS), SPECULOOS, and HARPS, and enhanced by recent advances with the centroiding technique for NGTS.

The planetary system NGTS-3A was detected by a conjointly model multi-colour photometry, centroids and radial velocity (RV) extraction process. RV cross-correlation functions (CCFs) and study correlations of the bisector inverse span (BIS) are simulated in order to define the characteristics of the exoplanet NGTS-3Ab.

== See also ==
- NGTS-3
- List of exoplanet firsts
- List of exoplanetary host stars
- List of exoplanets discovered using the Kepler spacecraft
- List of planets observed during Kepler's K2 mission
