= Gliese 436 =

Star in the constellation Leo

Gliese 436 / Noquisi
Observation data Epoch J2000 Equinox ICRS
- Constellation: Leo
- Right ascension: 11^{h} 42^{m} 11.09334^{s}
- Declination: +26° 42′ 23.6508″
- Apparent magnitude (V): 10.67

Characteristics
- Spectral type: M2.5 V
- Apparent magnitude (B): ~12.20
- Apparent magnitude (V): ~10.68
- Apparent magnitude (J): 6.900 ± 0.024
- Apparent magnitude (H): 6.319 ± 0.023
- Apparent magnitude (K): 6.073 ± 0.016
- U−B color index: +1.23
- B−V color index: +1.52

Astrometry
Radial velocity (R_{v})	+8.87±0.16 km/s
Proper motion (μ)	RA: 895.088(26) mas/yr Dec.: −813.550(25) mas/yr
Parallax (π)	102.3014±0.0302 mas
Distance	31.882 ± 0.009 ly (9.775 ± 0.003 pc)
Absolute magnitude (M_{V})	10.63

Details
Mass	0.425±0.009 M_{☉}
Radius	0.432±0.011 R_{☉}
Luminosity	0.02463±0.00029 L_{☉}
Surface gravity (log g)	4.833±0.013 cgs
Temperature	3,477+46 −44 K
Metallicity [Fe/H]	−0.46^{+0.31}_{−0.24} dex
Rotation	39.9±0.8 d
Rotational velocity (v sin i)	1.0 km/s
Age	7.41–11.05 Gyr

Other designations
- Noquisi, GJ 436, HIP 57087, LHS 310, LTT 13213, Ross 905, 2MASS J11421096+2642251

Database references
SIMBAD	data
Exoplanet Archive	data

Gliese 436, also known as Noquisi, is a red dwarf located 31.9 light-years (9.8 parsecs) away in the zodiac constellation of Leo. It has an apparent visual magnitude of 10.67, which is much too faint to be seen with the naked eye. However, it can be viewed with even a modest telescope of 2.4 in (6 cm) aperture. In 2004, the existence of an extrasolar planet, Gliese 436 b, was verified as orbiting the star. This planet was later discovered to transit its host star.

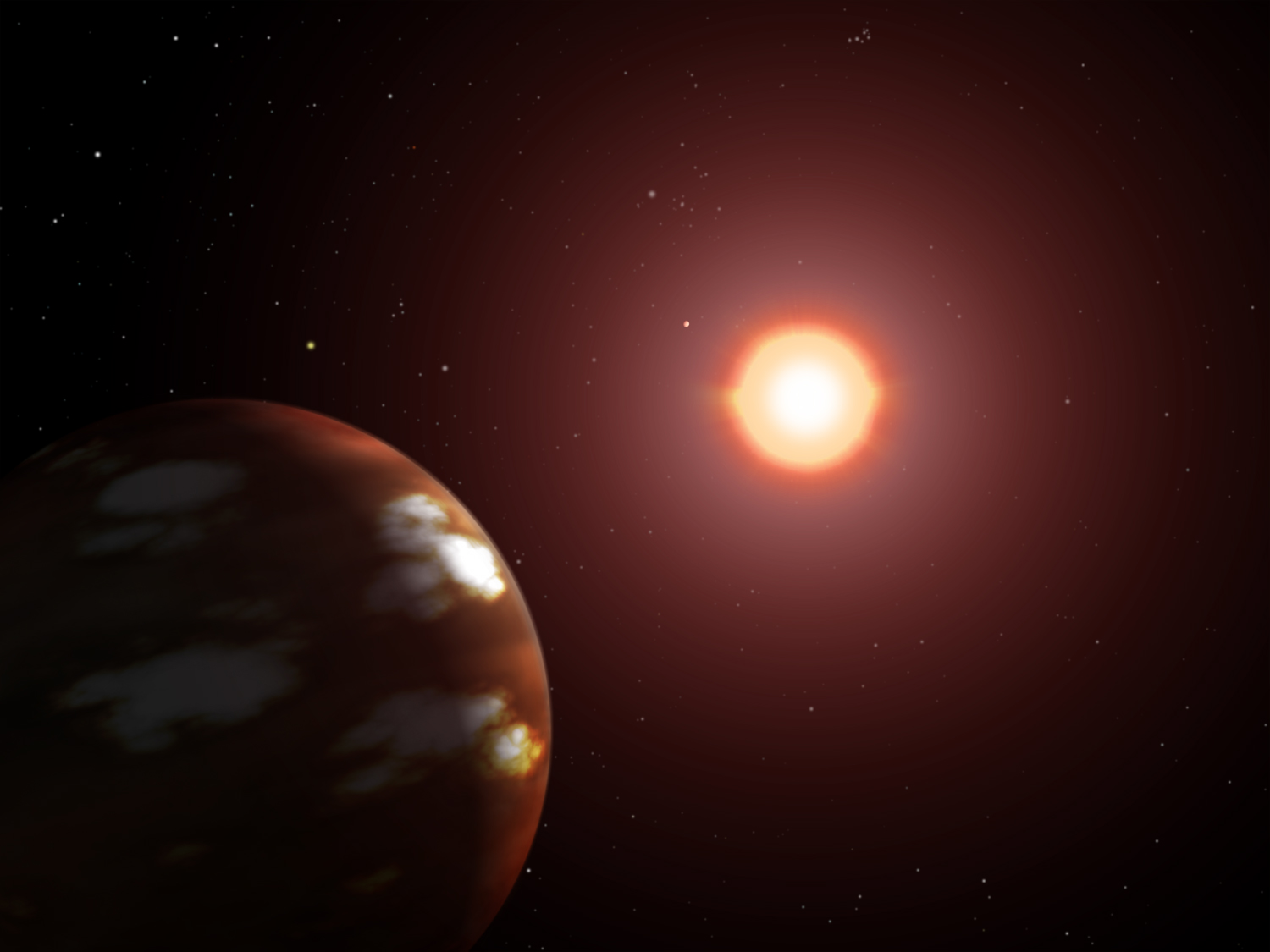
Gliese 436

== Nomenclature ==
The designation Gliese 436 comes from the Gliese Catalogue of Nearby Stars. This was the 436th star listed in the first edition of the catalogue.

In August 2022, this planetary system was included among 20 systems to be named by the third NameExoWorlds project. The approved names, proposed by a team from the United States, were announced in June 2023. Gliese 436 is named Noquisi and its planet is named Awohali, after the Cherokee words for "star" (ᏃᏈᏏ) and "eagle" (ᎠᏬᎭᎵ).

== Properties ==
Gliese 436 is a M2.5V star, which means it is a red dwarf. Stellar models give both an estimated mass and size of about 43% that of the Sun. The same model predicts that the outer atmosphere has an effective temperature of 3,480 K, giving it the orange-red hue of an M-type star. Small stars such as this generate energy at a low rate, giving it only 2.5% of the Sun's luminosity.

Gliese 436 is older than the Sun by several billion years and it has an abundance of heavy elements (with masses greater than helium-4) less than half% that of the Sun. The projected rotation velocity is 1.0 km/s, and the chromosphere has a low level of magnetic activity. Gliese 436 is a member of the "old-disk population" with velocity components in the galactic coordinate system of U=+44, V=−20 and W=+20 km/s.

== Planetary system ==
The star is orbited by one known planet, designated Gliese 436 b. The planet has an orbital period of 2.6 Earth days and transits the star as viewed from Earth. It has a mass of 22.2 Earth masses and is roughly 55,000 km in diameter, giving it a mass and radius similar to the ice giant planets Uranus and Neptune in the Solar System. In general, Doppler spectroscopy measurements do not measure the true mass of the planet, but instead measure the product m sin i, where m is the true mass and i is the inclination of the orbit (the angle between the line-of-sight and the normal to the planet's orbital plane), a quantity that is generally unknown. However, for Gliese 436 b, the transits enable the determination of the inclination, as they show that the planet's orbital plane is very nearly in the line of sight (i.e. that the inclination is close to 90 degrees). Hence the mass quoted is the actual mass. The planet is thought to be largely composed of hot ices with an outer envelope of hydrogen and helium, and is termed a "hot Neptune".

The Gliese 436 planetary system
Companion (in order from star)	Mass	Semimajor axis (AU)	Orbital period (days)	Eccentricity	Inclination (°)	Radius
b / Awohali	21.36+0.20 −0.21 M_{🜨}	0.028±0.01	2.64388±0.00006	0.152+0.009 −0.008	85.80+0.25 −0.21	4.33 ± 0.18 R_{🜨}

GJ 436 b's orbit is likely misaligned with its star's rotation. In addition the planet's orbit is eccentric. Because tidal forces would tend to circularise the orbit of the planet on short timescales, this suggested that Gliese 436 b is being perturbed by an additional planet orbiting the star.

=== Claims of additional planets ===
In 2008, a second planet, designated "Gliese 436 c" was claimed to have been discovered, with an orbital period of 5.2 days and an orbital semimajor axis of 0.045 AU. The planet was thought to have a mass of roughly 5 Earth masses and have a radius about 1.5 times larger than the Earth's. Due to its size, the planet was thought to be a rocky, terrestrial planet. It was announced by Spanish scientists in April 2008 by analyzing its influence on the orbit of Gliese 436 b. Further analysis showed that the transit length of the inner planet is not changing, a situation which rules out most possible configurations for this system. Also, if it did orbit at these parameters, the system would be the only "unstable" orbit on UA's Extrasolar Planet Interactions chart. The existence of this "Gliese 436 c" was thus regarded as unlikely, and the discovery was eventually retracted at the Transiting Planets conference in Boston, 2008.

Despite the retraction, studies concluded that the possibility that there is an additional planet orbiting Gliese 436 remained plausible. With the aid of an unnoticed transit automatically recorded at NMSU on January 11, 2005, and observations by amateur astronomers, it has been suggested that there is a trend of increasing inclination of the orbit of Gliese 436 b, though this trend remains unconfirmed. This trend is compatible with a perturbation by a planet of less than 12 Earth masses on an orbit within about 0.08 AU of the star.

In July 2012, NASA announced that astronomers at the University of Central Florida, using the Spitzer Space Telescope, strongly believed they had observed a second planet. This candidate planet was given the preliminary designation UCF-1.01, after the University of Central Florida. It was measured to have a radius of around two thirds that of Earth and, assuming an Earth-like density of 5.5 g/cm^{3}, was estimated to have a mass of 0.3 times that of Earth and a surface gravity of around two thirds that of Earth. It was thought to orbit at 0.0185 AU from the star, every 1.3659 days. The astronomers also believed they had found some evidence for an additional planet candidate, UCF-1.02, which is of a similar size, though with only one detected transit its orbital period is unknown. Follow up observations with the Hubble Space Telescope as well as a reanalysis of the Spitzer Space Telescope data were unable to confirm these planets.

== See also ==
- List of stars in Leo
