= NGTS-3 =

Binary star in the constellation Columba

Observation data Epoch J2000 Equinox ICRS
- Constellation: Columba
- Right ascension: 06^{h} 17^{m} 46.75^{s}
- Declination: −35° 42′ 23.0″
- Apparent magnitude (V): 14.67±0.01

Characteristics
- Evolutionary stage: main sequence + main sequence
- Spectral type: G6 V + K1 V
- B−V color index: +0.77
- R−I color index: +0.36

Astrometry
Radial velocity (R_{v})	8.57±0.05 km/s
Proper motion (μ)	RA: -8.838 mas/yr Dec.: +8.771 mas/yr
Parallax (π)	1.3153±0.0193 mas
Distance	2,480 ± 40 ly (760 ± 10 pc)

Details

A
Mass	1.02±0.09 M_{☉}
Radius	0.93±0.23 R_{☉}
Luminosity	0.72±0.03 L_{☉}
Surface gravity (log g)	4.45 cgs
Temperature	5,600±150 K
Metallicity [Fe/H]	0.12±0.15 dex
Rotational velocity (v sin i)	1.0±0.7 km/s

Other designations
- Gaia DR2 2885350546895266432

Database references
SIMBAD	data
Exoplanet Archive	data

NGTS-3 is a star system located in the southern constellation Columba. With an apparent magnitude of 14.67, it requires a powerful telescope to observe. However, NGTS-3 is actually an unresolved spectroscopic binary system. The system is located approximately 2,480 light years away, based on parallax measurement, and is receding with a radial velocity of 8.57 km/s.

The system consists of two main sequence stars, classified as G6 and K1, respectively; however, only the properties of the primary star are known. NGTS-3A has a similar mass to that of the Sun, but is 7% smaller in radius. It radiates at 72% of the Sun's luminosity from its photosphere at an effective temperature of 5,600 K, which gives it the typical yellow hue characteristic of a G-type star.

== Planetary System ==
In 2018, the NGTS survey discovered an inflated hot Jupiter orbiting NGTS-3A despite the components being visually unresolved.

The NGTS-3A planetary system
Companion (in order from star)	Mass	Semimajor axis (AU)	Orbital period (days)	Eccentricity	Inclination (°)	Radius
b	2.38 ± 0.26 M_{J}	0.023+0.007 −0.005	1.6753728 ± 0.0000030	0?	89.56+0.31 −0.48	1.48 ± 0.37 R_{J}
