= NGTS-1 =

High proper motion red dwarf

Observation data Epoch J2000.0 (ICRS) Equinox J2000.0 (ICRS)
- Constellation: Columba
- Right ascension: 05^{h} 30^{m} 51.45227^{s}
- Declination: −36° 37′ 50.8957″
- Apparent magnitude (V): 15.57±0.03

Characteristics
- Evolutionary stage: main sequence star
- Spectral type: M0.5
- B−V color index: +1.37
- R−I color index: +1.39

Astrometry
Radial velocity (R_{v})	97.18±0.01 km/s
Proper motion (μ)	RA: −31.887 mas/yr Dec.: −41.077 mas/yr
Parallax (π)	4.5935±0.017 mas
Distance	710 ± 3 ly (217.7 ± 0.8 pc)

Details
Mass	0.617^{+0.023}_{−0.062} M_{☉}
Radius	0.573±0.077 R_{☉}
Luminosity	(7.03±0.09)×10^{−2} L_{☉}
Surface gravity (log g)	4.71±0.23 cgs
Temperature	3,916^{+71}_{−63} K
Rotational velocity (v sin i)	<1.0 km/s

Other designations
- UCAC2 16099071, NGTS-1, UCAC4 267-006604, DENIS J053051.4-363750, TIC 192826603 USNO-B1.0 0533-00066386, 2MASS J05305145-3637508,UCAC3 107-15281, Gaia DR2 4821739369794767744

Database references
SIMBAD	data
Exoplanet Archive	data

NGTS-1, also designated as TOI-551 is a solitary star located in the southern constellation Columba, the dove. With an apparent magnitude of 15.52, NGTS-1 can only be seen through a powerful telescope. Gaia DR3 parallax measurements imply a distance of 710 light-years and it is drifting away rapidly with a heliocentric radial velocity of 97.2 km/s.

== Properties ==
NGTS-1 has a stellar classification of M0.5, indicating that is an early M-type star. It has 61% of the mass of the Sun and over half of its radius. Since red dwarfs are fully convective, they do not burn as much as more massive stars. As a result, NGTS-1 only radiates 7.02% of the luminosity of the Sun from its photosphere at an effective temperature of 3,916 K. There was difficulty determining the metallicity of the object due to its faintness, but NGTS-1 is assumed to be around solar metallicity. In addition, this also provided some uncertainty about the star's properties since red dwarfs properties are dependent on their metallicity. It spins too slowly for it to be measured accurately, having a projected rotational velocity lower than 1.0 km/s.

== Planetary system ==
The discovery of a hot Jupiter orbiting the star was reported in 2017 as part of the Next Generation Transit Survey. The media also dubbed NGTS-1b as "monstrous" since the planet is relatively large compared to its host star.

The NGTS-1 planetary system
Companion (in order from star)	Mass	Semimajor axis (AU)	Orbital period (days)	Eccentricity	Inclination	Radius
b	0.812+0.066 −0.075 M_{J}	0.0326+0.0047 −0.0045	2.6473068±0.0000017	0.016+0.023 −0.012	85.27+0.61 −0.73°	1.33+0.61 −0.33 R_{J}
