= Miniature Exoplanet Radial Velocity Array =

Telescope array

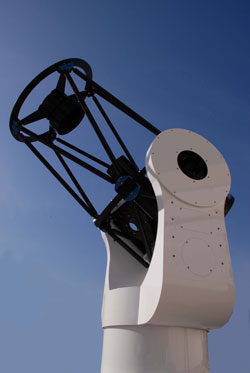
- One of the individual telescopes of the Minerva project
- Alternative names: MINiature Exoplanet Radial Velocity Array
- Location(s): Mount Hopkins, Arizona
- Coordinates: 31°41′18″N 110°53′07″W
- Website: www.cfa.harvard.edu/minerva/
- Location of Miniature Exoplanet Radial Velocity Array
- Related media on Commons

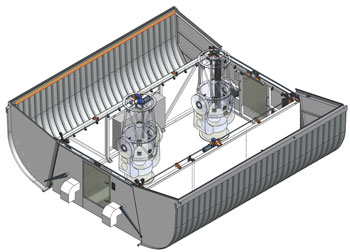
A diagram of one of the project's enclosures with two telescopes

The MINiature Exoplanet Radial Velocity Array (MINERVA) is a ground-based robotic dedicated exoplanet observatory. The facility is an array of small-aperture robotic telescopes outfitted for both photometry and high-resolution Doppler spectroscopy located at the U.S. Fred Lawrence Whipple Observatory at Mt. Hopkins, Arizona. The project's principal investigator is the American astronomer Jason Eastman. The telescopes were manufactured by PlaneWave Instruments.

== Science objectives ==
The primary science goal of MINERVA is to discover Earth-like planets in close-in (less than 50-day) orbits around nearby stars, and super-Earths (3-15 times the mass of Earth) in the habitable zones of the closest Sun-like stars. The secondary goal is to look for transits (eclipses) of known and newly discovered extrasolar planets. The unique design of the MINERVA observatory allows the pursuit of both goals simultaneously.

== Specifications and status ==
- Telescopes: Four PlaneWave CDK700, 0.7m telescopes within 2 custom telescope enclosures designed by LCOGT engineers. One MINERVA-Red telescope
- Cameras: 2k × 2k back illuminated CCD with 15 μm pixels offering > 20’ f.o.v.
- Spectrograph: Stabilized, R = 75,000 echelle spectrograph with iodine cell for precise radial velocimetry designed by KiwiStar Optics (a business unit of Callaghan Innovation; a New Zealand government-owned Crown entity).
- Status: Full photometric science operations began in May 2015 at FLWO. The spectrograph was installed Dec 2015.

== MINERVA-Red ==
MINERVA-Red is an echelle spectrograph optimized for the 'deep red', between 800 nm and 900 nm (where M-dwarfs are brightest) with a robotic 0.7 meter telescope. It uses a Fabry-Perot etalon and U/Ne lamp for wavelength calibration.

== See also ==
- List of extrasolar planets

=== Other exoplanet search projects ===
- HATNet Project (HAT)
- Kilodegree Extremely Little Telescope (KELT)
- Next-Generation Transit Survey (NGTS)
- Trans-Atlantic Exoplanet Survey (TrES)
- XO Telescope
