= NGTS-6 =

Star with a short-period planet in Caelum

Observation data Epoch J2000.0 Equinox ICRS
- Constellation: Caelum
- Right ascension: 05^{h} 03^{m} 10.90284^{s}
- Declination: −30° 23′ 57.7189″
- Apparent magnitude (V): 14.12±0.03

Characteristics
- Evolutionary stage: main sequence
- Spectral type: K

Astrometry
Radial velocity (R_{v})	−19.14±0.01 km/s
Proper motion (μ)	RA: −9.308 mas/yr Dec.: −22.014 mas/yr
Parallax (π)	3.2536±0.0126 mas
Distance	1,002 ± 4 ly (307 ± 1 pc)

Details
Mass	0.767±0.025 M_{☉}
Radius	0.754±0.013 R_{☉}
Luminosity	0.256±0.009 L_{☉}
Surface gravity (log g)	4.7^{+1.1}_{−0.7} cgs
Temperature	4,730^{+44}_{−40} K
Metallicity [Fe/H]	0.11±0.09 dex
Rotational velocity (v sin i)	2.85±0.43 km/s
Age	9.77^{+0.25}_{−0.54} Gyr

Other designations
- NGTS-6, TOI-448, TIC 1528696, 2MASS J05031090-3023576

Database references
SIMBAD	data
Exoplanet Archive	data

NGTS-6 is a star located in the southern constellation Caelum, the chisel. It has an apparent magnitude of 14.12, making it readily visible in telescopes with an aperture of at least 203 millimeters; it can also be viewed in telescopes with an aperture between 152 and 203 mm, albeit faintly. The star is located relatively far at a distance of 1,002 light years based on parallax measurements from the Gaia spacecraft, but it is drifting closer with a heliocentric radial velocity of −19.14 km/s.

NGTS-6 is a K-type main sequence star that has 76.7% the mass of the Sun and 75.4% of the Sun's radius. However, it only radiates 25.6% of the Sun's luminosity from its photosphere at an effective temperature of 4,730 K, giving it an orange hue when viewed in a telescope. It is metal enriched with of the Sun's abundance of iron. Such stars are more likely to form giant planets. NGTS-6 is estimated to be 9.77 billion years old and it spins modestly with a projected rotational velocity of 2.85 km/s.

== Planetary system ==
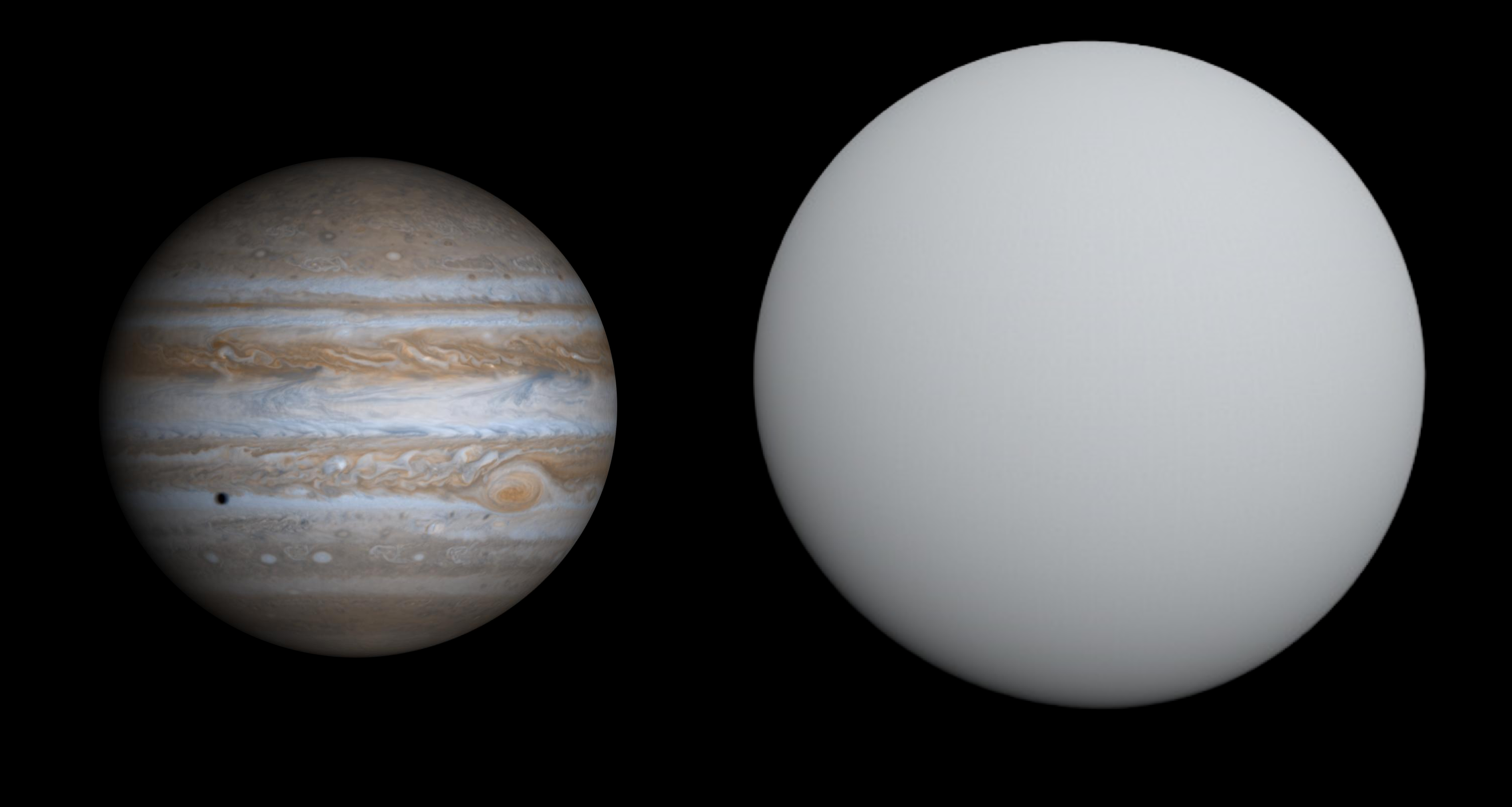
NGTS-6b compared to Jupiter

In 2018, a ultra-hot Jupiter was discovered orbiting the star based on transit data from the Next Generation Transit Survey. It was confirmed a year later based on doppler spectroscopy data from CORALIE and FEROS. NGTS-6b orbits extremely closely to its host star within a 21.17 hour period, making it an ultra-short period planet. The planet is 33.9% more massive than Jupiter, but it is 32.6% larger as a result of tidal heating from its close proximity. The system was included in a 2024 survey as a potential target for studying the orbital decay of exoplanets.

The NGTS-6 planetary system
Companion (in order from star)	Mass	Semimajor axis (AU)	Orbital period (hours)	Eccentricity	Inclination (°)	Radius
NGTS-6b	1.339±0.028 M_{J}	0.01677±0.00032	21.169404±0.00000792	0.00 (fixed)	78.231^{+0.262}_{−0.210}	1.326^{+0.097}_{−0.112} R_{J}
