= HAT-P-11 =

Planet-hosting star in the constellation Cygnus

Observation data Epoch J2000 Equinox ICRS
- Constellation: Cygnus
- Right ascension: 19^{h} 50^{m} 50.2473^{s}
- Declination: +48° 04′ 51.101″
- Apparent magnitude (V): 9.59

Characteristics
- Spectral type: K4V
- Apparent magnitude (B): 10.66±0.05
- Apparent magnitude (J): 7.608±0.029
- Apparent magnitude (H): 7.131±0.021
- Apparent magnitude (K): 7.009±0.020
- Variable type: planetary transit

Astrometry
Radial velocity (R_{v})	−63.46±0.13 km/s
Proper motion (μ)	RA: 126.095(13) mas/yr Dec.: 232.726(13) mas/yr
Parallax (π)	26.4274±0.0108 mas
Distance	123.42 ± 0.05 ly (37.84 ± 0.02 pc)
Absolute magnitude (M_{V})	6.57±0.09

Details
Mass	0.81+0.03 −0.02 M_{☉}
Radius	0.683±0.009 R_{☉}
Luminosity	0.26±0.02 L_{☉}
Surface gravity (log g)	4.59±0.03 cgs
Temperature	4780±50 K
Metallicity [Fe/H]	0.31±0.05 dex
Rotation	~29.2 days
Rotational velocity (v sin i)	1.5±1.5 km/s
Age	6.5+5.9 −4.1 Gyr

Other designations
- HAT-P-11, BD+47°2936, HIP 97657, NLTT 48335, Kepler-3, KOI-3, KIC 10748390, TOI-1144, TIC 28230919, TYC 3561-2092-1, GSC 03561-02092

Database references
SIMBAD	data
KIC	data

HAT-P-11, also designated GSC 03561-02092 and Kepler-3, is a metal-rich orange dwarf star with a planetary system, 123 light-years (38 parsecs) away in the constellation Cygnus. This star is notable for its relatively large rate of proper motion. The apparent magnitude of this star is about 9.6, which means it is not visible to the naked eye but can be seen with a medium-sized amateur telescope on a clear dark night. The age of this star is about 6.5 billion years.

The star has active latitudes that generate starspots. The spots are similar in distribution to those on the Sun, but HAT-P-11 is a more active star and has a starspot coverage approximately 100 times greater than the Sun. The star appears to have an unusually small radius, which can be explained by the anomalously high helium fraction.

== Planetary system ==
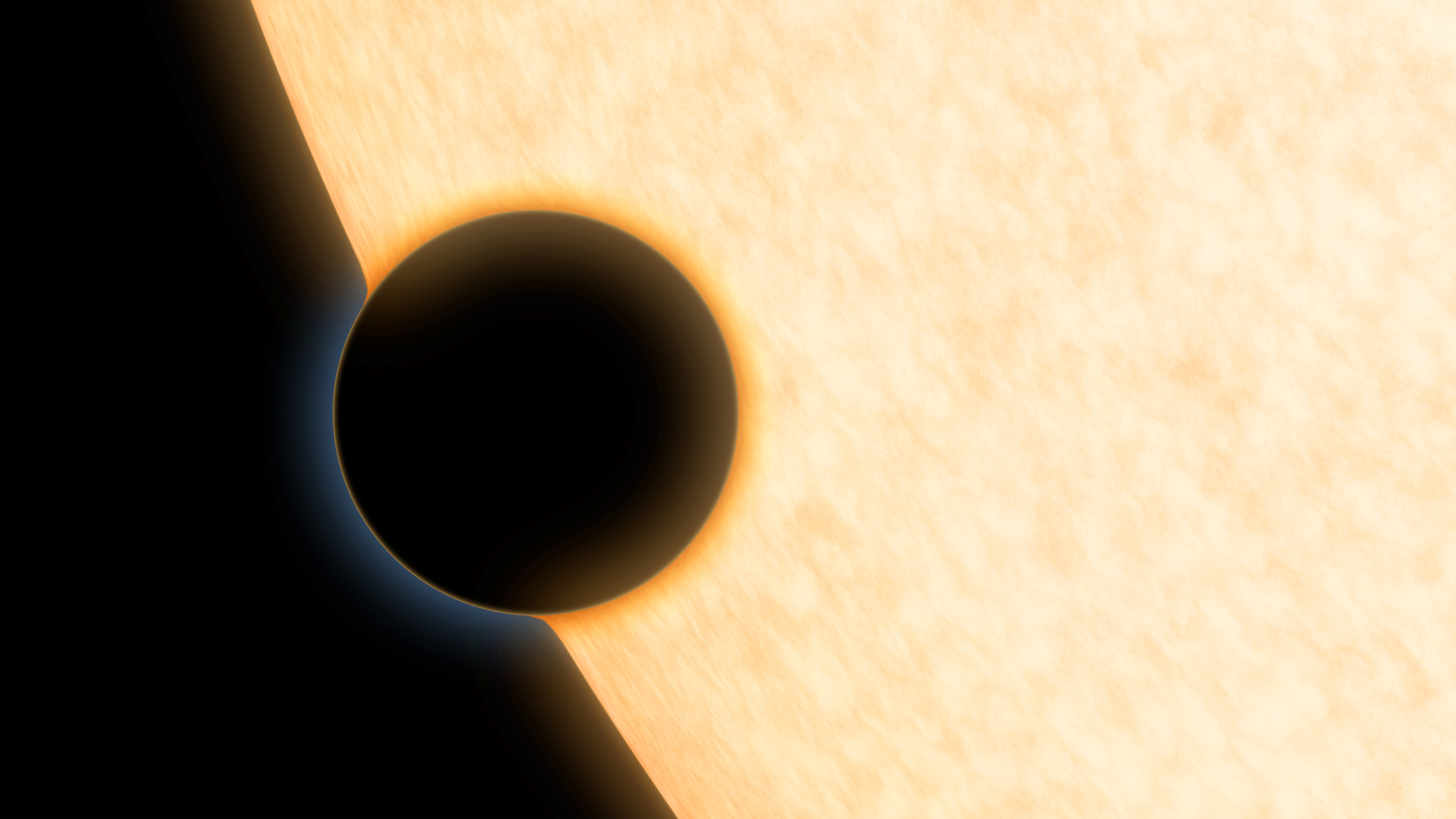
Artist Illustration of planet HAT-P-11b.

An exoplanet, designated HAT-P-11b, was discovered by the HATNet Project using the transit method, believed to be a little larger than the planet Neptune.

The planet orbits out of alignment from the star's spin axis, with an obliquity of about 100°. This star system was within the field of view of the Kepler Mission planet-hunter spacecraft. Water vapor and ammonia have been detected in the atmosphere of HAT-P-11b.

A trend in the radial velocity measurements taken to confirm the planet indicated a possible additional body in the system. This was confirmed in 2018 when a second planet, HAT-P-11c, was detected on an approximately nine-year orbit. In 2020, an astrometric detection of HAT-P-11c was published, along with Pi Mensae b, allowing its inclination and true mass to be determined.

Multiple 2024 studies present conflicting results about HAT-P-11c. One study suggests that the radial velocity variations attributed to HAT-P-11c may actually be caused by a magnetic activity cycle of the star. If this is the case, an outer planet may still exist given the evidence for one from astrometry, but farther from the star and with a different mass than previously thought. Another study instead claims further confirmation of the previously proposed planet. A third paper, published in response to the first, also corroborates the planetary nature of HAT-P-11c based on additional radial velocity data.

The HAT-P-11 planetary system
Companion (in order from star)	Mass	Semimajor axis (AU)	Orbital period (days)	Eccentricity	Inclination (°)	Radius
b	25.0±1.5 M_{🜨}	0.0532±0.0010	4.887802443(34)	0.2577+0.0033 −0.0025	89.027±0.068	4.901±0.065 R_{🜨}
c	2.36+0.33 −0.32 M_{J}	4.214+0.084 −0.110	3,632+20 −159	0.608+0.039 −0.032	138.5+6.0 −9.1	—

== See also ==
- HATNet Project
- Kepler Mission
