= NGTS-1b =

Hot Jupiter exoplanet in the constellation Columba

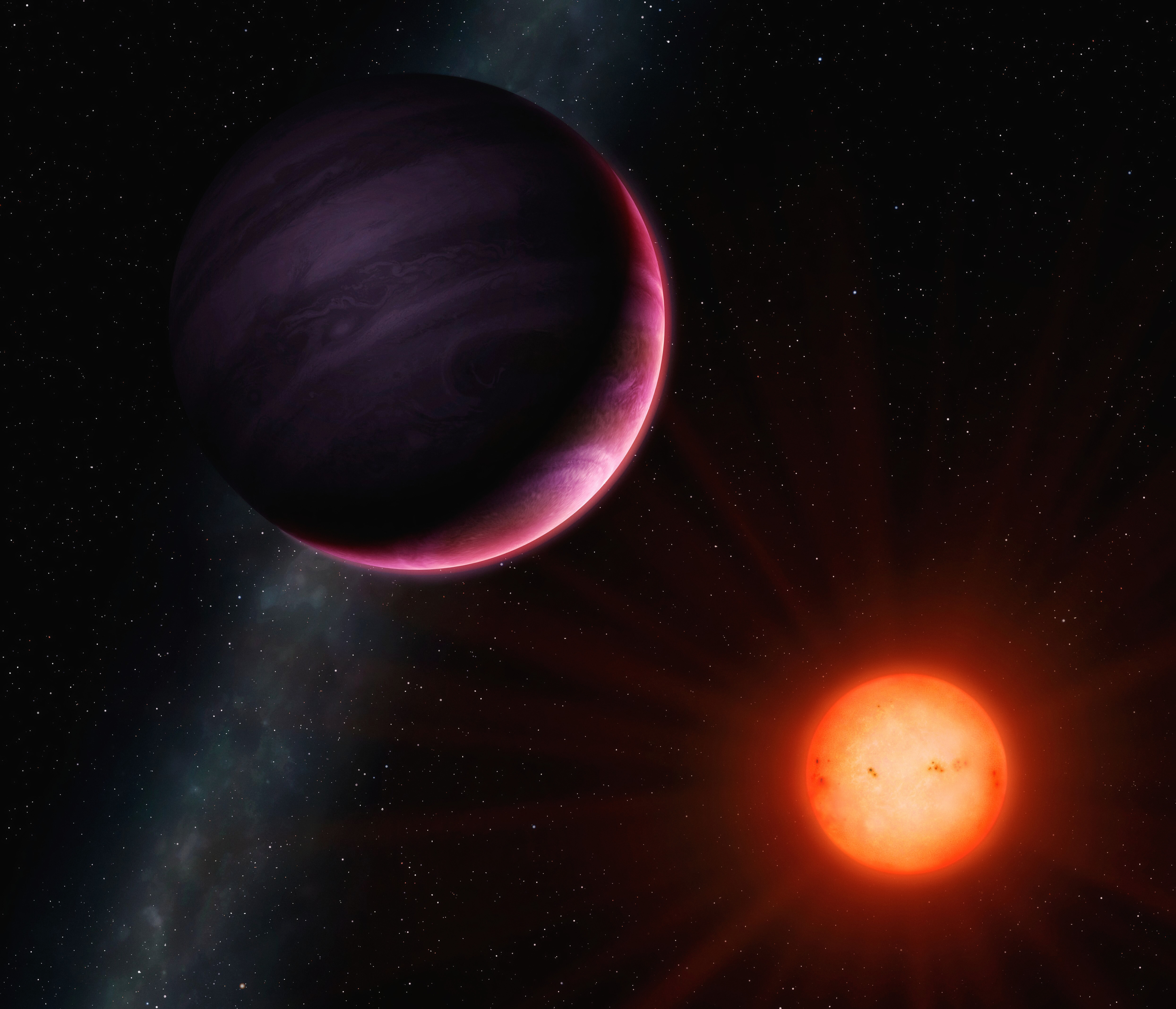
- artist's concept of exoplanet NGTS-1b

Discovery
- Discovered by: Next-Generation Transit Survey
- Discovery date: 2017
- Detection method: NGTS telescopes together with EulerCam photometric and HARPS spectroscopy followups.

Orbital characteristics
- Semi-major axis: 0.0326+0.0047 −0.0045 AU
- Eccentricity: 0.016+0.023 −0.012
- Orbital period (sidereal): 2.6473068±0.0000017 d
- Inclination: 85.27+0.61 −0.73
- Time of periastron: 2,458,586.32972±0.00040
- Semi-amplitude: 166±11 m/s
- Star: NGTS-1

Physical characteristics
- Mean radius: 1.33+0.61 −0.33 R_{J}
- Mass: 0.812+0.066 −0.075 M_{J}
- Mean density: 0.420+0.590 −0.280 g cm^{−3}
- Temperature: 790±20 K

NGTS-1b is a confirmed hot Jupiter-sized extrasolar planet orbiting NGTS-1, a red dwarf star about half the mass and radius of the Sun, every 2.65 days. The NGTS-1 system is about 716 light-years from Earth in the constellation Columba.

== Discovery ==
The exoplanet, NGTS-1b, was discovered by the Next-Generation Transit Survey. Daniel Bayliss, of the University of Warwick, and lead author of the study describing the discovery of NGTS-1b, stated, "The discovery of NGTS-1b was a complete surprise to us—such massive planets were not thought to exist around such small stars—importantly, our challenge now is to find out how common these types of planets are in the Galaxy, and with the new Next-Generation Transit Survey facility we are well-placed to do just that."

== Characteristics ==
=== Mass, radius and temperature ===
NGTS-1b is a hot Jupiter-sized gas giant exoplanet that has a mass of 0.812 M_{J} and a radius of 1.33 R_{J}, where M_{J} and R_{J} are the mass and radius of Jupiter.

=== Host star ===
The planet orbits an M0.5 dwarf star about half the mass (0.617 M_{☉}) and radius (0.573 R_{☉}) of the Sun.

=== Orbit ===
NGTS-1b orbits about 4.5 million km (2.8 million mi) from the host star every 2.6473 Earth-days.

== See also ==
- Kepler-45b
- List of extrasolar planets
