= Kepler-45 =

M-type star in the constellation Cygnus

Observation data Epoch J2000 Equinox ICRS
- Constellation: Cygnus
- Right ascension: 19^{h} 31^{m} 29.4966^{s}
- Declination: +41° 03′ 51.356″
- Apparent magnitude (V): 16.88

Characteristics
- Evolutionary stage: main sequence
- Spectral type: M1 V

Astrometry
Proper motion (μ)	RA: 4.646(36) mas/yr Dec.: −21.589(36) mas/yr
Parallax (π)	2.5984±0.0331 mas
Distance	1,260 ± 20 ly (385 ± 5 pc)

Details
Mass	0.59 ± 0.06 M_{☉}
Radius	0.55 ± 0.11 R_{☉}
Temperature	3820 ± 90 K
Metallicity [Fe/H]	0.13 ± 0.13 dex

Other designations
- Kepler-45, KOI-254, KIC 5794240, 2MASS J19312949+4103513, Gaia DR2 2053562475706063744

Database references
SIMBAD	data
KIC	data

Kepler-45, formerly known as KOI-254, is a star in the northern constellation of Cygnus. It is located at the celestial coordinates: right ascension 19^{h} 31^{m} 29.495^{s}, declination +41° 03′ 51.37″. With an apparent visual magnitude of 16.88, this star is too faint to be seen with the naked eye.

The star is exhibiting strong starspot activity, with 4.1±2.5% of its surface covered by starspots.

== Planetary system ==
The Kepler-45 planetary system
Companion (in order from star)	Mass	Semimajor axis (AU)	Orbital period (days)	Eccentricity	Inclination (°)	Radius
b	0.5505 M_{J}	0.030	2.455239	—	—	11 R_{🜨}

The "Hot Jupiter" class planet Kepler-45b, discovered in February 2011, is unusually massive for the M-class parent star. Its orbit is aligned within 11 degrees of rotational axis of the star.

Kepler-45b's transit lightcurve appears to deviate from what would be expected of a spherical planet. The deviation could be caused by material surrounding the planet, such as a dusty shell from an escaping atmosphere or a dense exoring.

== See also ==
- NGTS-1b
