= Helium planet =

Planet with helium-dominated atmosphere

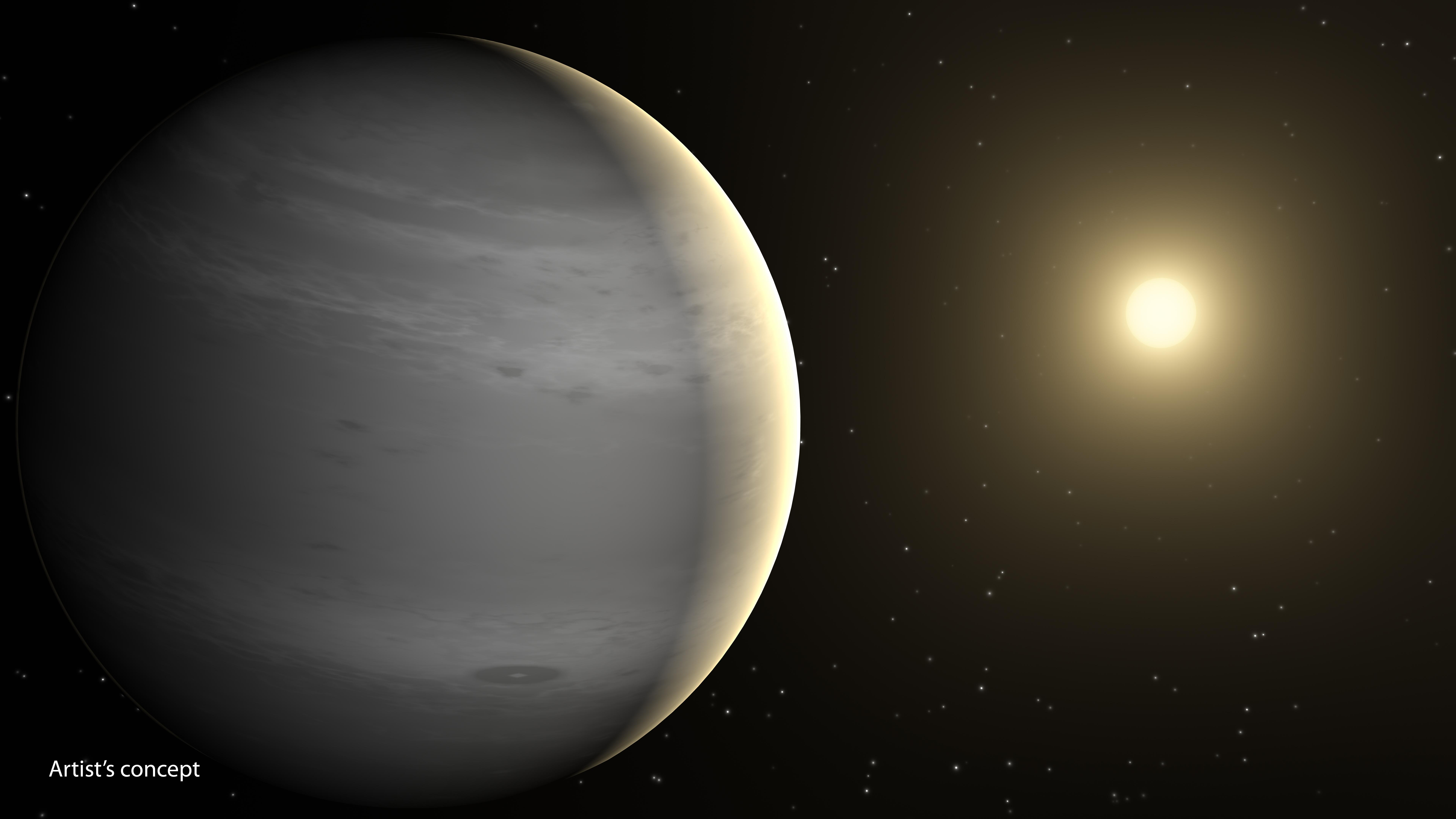
Helium planets would have a white or grey hue. (Artist's conception shown.)

A helium planet is a planet with a helium-dominated atmosphere. This contrasts with ordinary gas giants such as Jupiter and Saturn, whose atmospheres consist primarily of hydrogen, with helium as a secondary component only. Helium planets might form in a variety of ways. Gliese 436 b is a possible helium planet. Helium planets might be able to harbour life as we know it.

== Formation ==
There are several hypotheses for how a helium planet might form.

=== Hydrogen evaporation from giant planets ===
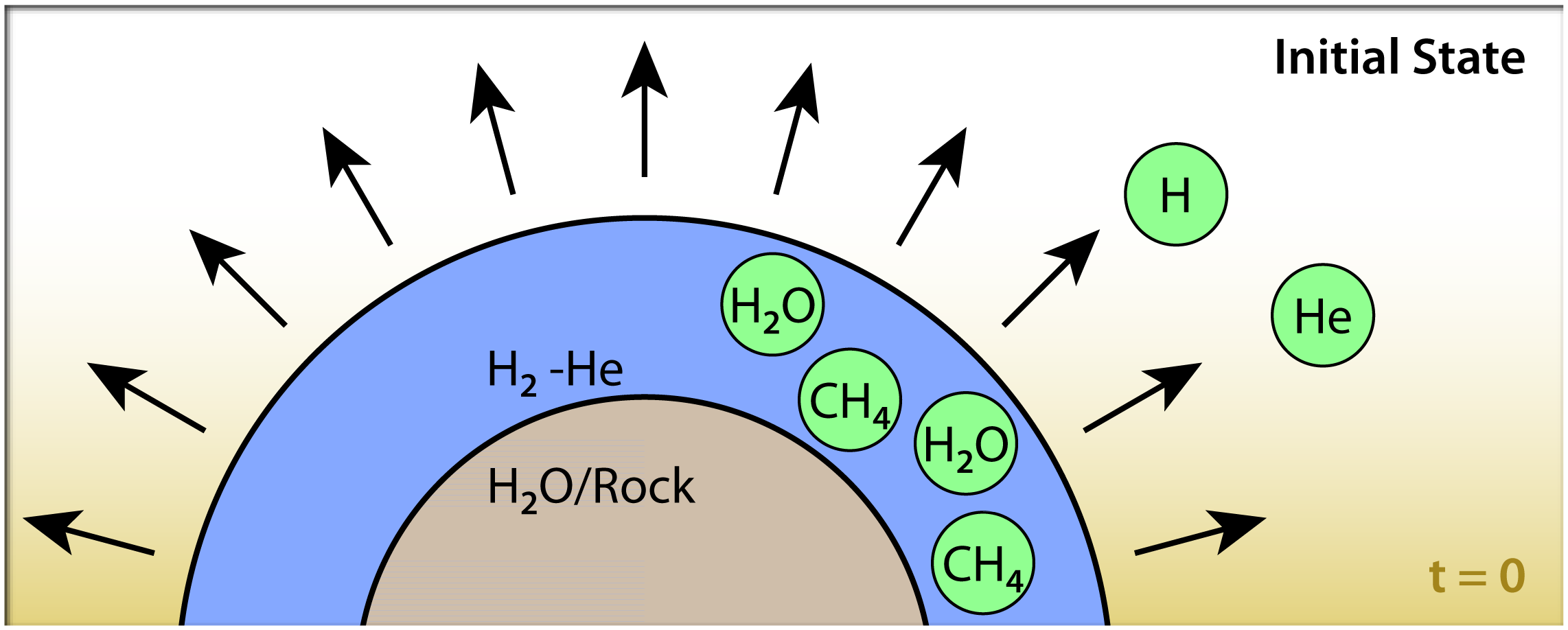
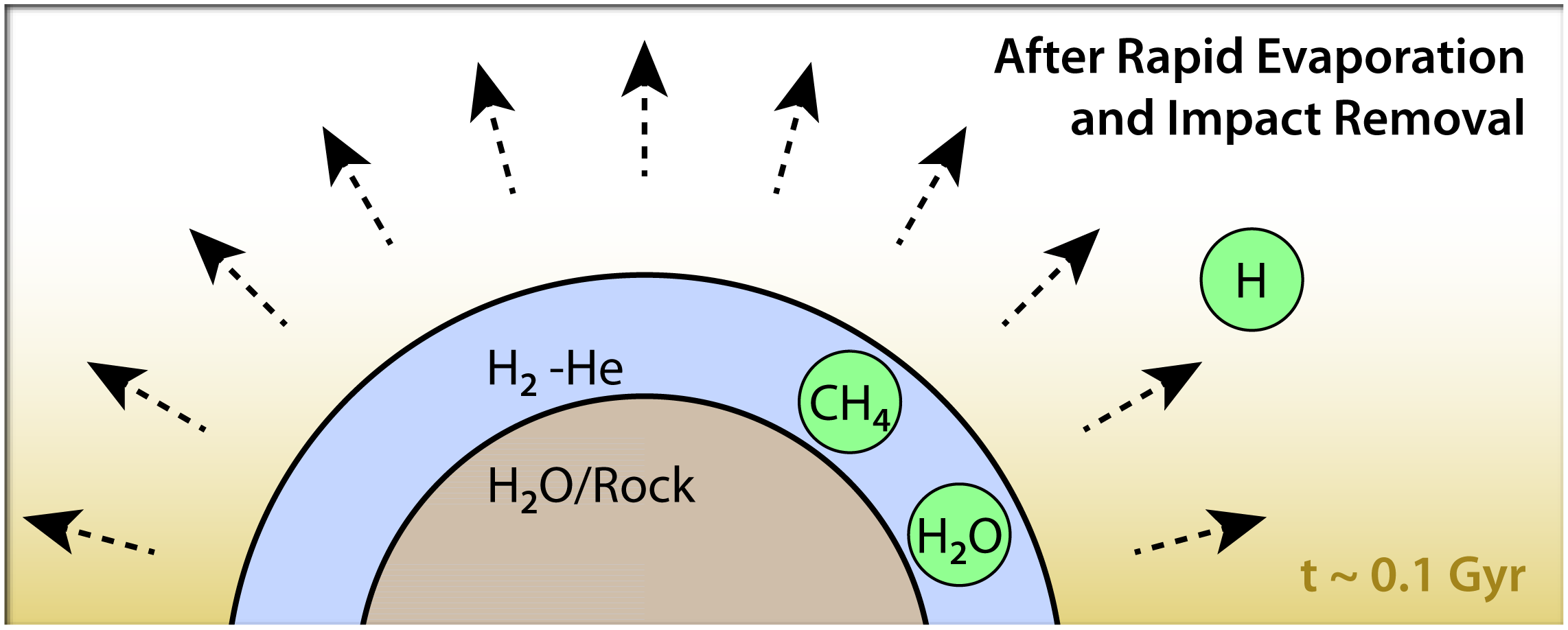
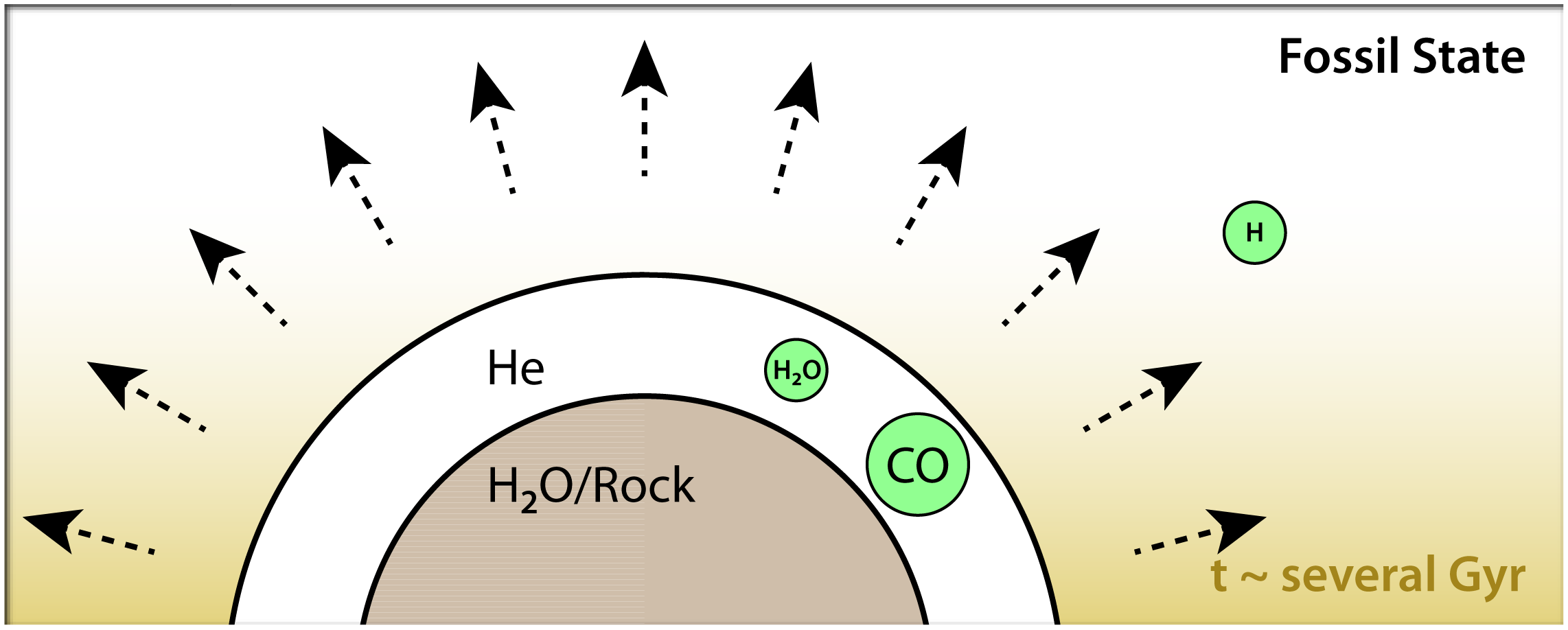
Formation of a helium planet from a hot giant planet through atmospheric escape, possibly like Gliese 436 b.

A helium planet might form via hydrogen evaporation from a gaseous planet orbiting close to a star. The star will drive off lighter gases more effectively through evaporation than heavier gasses, and over time deplete the hydrogen, leaving a greater proportion of helium behind.

A scenario for forming helium planets from regular giant planets involves an ice giant, in an orbit so close to its host star that the hydrogen effectively boils out of the atmosphere, evaporating from and escaping the gravitational hold of the planet. The planet's atmosphere will experience a large energy input and because light gases are more readily evaporated than heavier gases, the proportion of helium will steadily increase in the remaining atmosphere. Such a process will take some time to stabilize and completely drive out all the hydrogen, perhaps on the order of 10 billion years, depending on the precise physical conditions and the nature of the planet and the star. Hot Neptunes are candidates for such a scenario.

The loss of hydrogen also leads to a depletion of methane in the atmosphere. On ice giants, methane naturally forms a cycle of melting, evaporation, breakdown and subsequent recombination and condensation. But as hydrogen gets depleted, a fraction of the carbon atoms will not be able to recombine with free hydrogen in the atmosphere and over time this will lead to an overall loss of methane. With time, the methane in the atmospheres of hot ice giants will also get depleted.

=== White dwarf remnants ===
A helium-rich planetary object may also form from a low-mass white dwarf, which gets depleted of hydrogen via mass transfer in a close binary system with a second, massive object like a neutron star.

One scenario involves an AM CVn type of symbiotic binary star composed of two helium-core white dwarfs surrounded by a circumbinary helium accretion disk formed during mass transfer from the less massive to the more massive white dwarf. After it loses most of its mass, the less massive white dwarf may approach planetary mass.

== Characteristics ==
Helium planets are expected to be distinguishable from regular hydrogen-dominated planets by strong evidence of carbon monoxide and carbon dioxide in the atmosphere. Due to hydrogen depletion, the expected methane in the atmosphere cannot form because there is no hydrogen for the carbon to combine with, hence carbon combines with oxygen instead, forming CO and CO_{2}. Due to the atmospheric composition, helium planets are expected to be white or grey in appearance. Such a signature can be found in Gliese 436 b, which has a predominance of carbon monoxide, and is hypothesized to be a helium planet.

== See also ==
- Planet § Formation
