= NGTS-14Ab =

Neptunian planet orbiting NGTS-14

Discovery
- Discovered by: NGTS (Next-Generation Transit Survey)
- Discovery date: January 2021
- Detection method: Transit method

Designations
- Named after: NGTS (Next-Generation Transit Survey)
- Alternative names: 2MASS J21540423-3822388, TIC 197643976

Orbital characteristics
- Orbital period (sidereal): 3.54 days
- Star: NGTS-14

Physical characteristics
- Mean radius: 0.444 ± 0.030 R Jupiter
- Mass: 0.09 Jovian masses

NGTS-14Ab or 2MASS J21540423-3822388 is a Neptune-sized (Sub-Jovian) exoplanet that was discovered by NGTS (Next-Generation Transit Survey) and is located in the NGTS-14 planetary system. The discovery was announced in January 2021. The orbital period of NGTS-14Ab is around 3.54 days. The age of NGTS-14Ab is approximately 5.9 billion years old. The exoplanet is around 0.44 Jovian radii.
