= LTT 9779 b =

Exoplanet in the Neptunian Desert

LTT 9779 b / Cuancoá
Discovery
- Discovered by: Jenkins et al.
- Discovery site: Transiting Exoplanet Survey Satellite
- Discovery date: 2020
- Detection method: Transit

Designations
- Alternative names: Cuancoá, TOI-193 b

Orbital characteristics
- Semi-major axis: 0.01734+0.00136 −0.00160 AU
- Eccentricity: <0.01
- Orbital period (sidereal): 0.79206418(12) days
- Inclination: 76.55°+1.27° −1.75°
- Star: LTT 9779

Physical characteristics
- Mean radius: 4.501+0.135 −0.157 R_{🜨}
- Mass: 29.65+0.78 −0.77 M_{🜨}
- Albedo: 0.73±0.11 (Geometric)
- Temperature: Dayside: 2,260+40 −50 K Nightside: 1,330 K

LTT 9779 b, officially named Cuancoá, is a Neptune-sized planet orbiting the sunlike star LTT 9779, or Uúba. As of 2023, it has the highest-known albedo of any planet. It was discovered in 2020 using data from the Transiting Exoplanet Survey Satellite (TESS), and is also called TOI-193 b.

== Characteristics ==
LTT 9779 b is one of the few known planets in the Neptunian desert. It is highly reflective, with a geometric albedo of 0.73±0.11 (reflects 73% of light +/- 11%). This makes it the most reflective exoplanet discovered so far. It completes an orbit around LTT 9779 in less than a day, making temperatures on the day side soar to over 2,000 degrees Celsius. Global climate models of the planet indicate it has a very metal-rich atmosphere, with clouds made of silicate likely being present.

Being in the Neptunian desert, LTT 9779 b is a very rare class of planet, with few like it being known. It is estimated that only 1 in 200 Sun-like stars possess a planet with an orbital period of less than a day, and most of those are Hot Jupiters or rocky planets, with ultra-hot Neptune planets being rare. Because of this, LTT 9779 b has been extensively studied by many space telescopes including Hubble and James Webb (JWST).

A study using JWST NIRISS found highly reflective white clouds on the western dayside of LTT 9779b. The researchers suggest an eastwards equatorial jet, leading to a colder western dayside, allowing the formation of silicate clouds. These clouds can be best described as composed of MgSiO_{3} (enstatite) and Mg_{2}SiO_{4} (forsterite). The study also detected water vapor in the atmosphere in the form of a dip at 1.4 μm. The dayside temperature was measured to be 2,260+40
−50 K and the nightside temperature was measured to be <1,330 K. However, a pure cloudy atmosphere is inconsistent with the results of a 2025 study, which indicates that some mixing processes might have affected the atmospheric composition of LTT 9779 b.

Another study in 2025 confirms the planet has a metal-rich atmosphere and also suggest it likely has silicate (MgSiO_{3}) clouds.

== Name ==
LTT 9779 b was officially named Cuancoá in 2022 by the International Astronomical Union, as part of the NameExoWorlds competition. Cuancoá is a word that refers to the morning star in the Uwa language (Tunebo). Cuancoá's star was named Uúba after the word for 'star', 'seed', and 'eye' in the same language.

== See also ==
- List of proper names of exoplanets
- Neptunian desert
- NGTS-4b, another planet in the Neptunian desert
