= HAT-P-11b =

Super Neptune orbiting HAT-P-11

HAT-P-11b / Kepler-3b
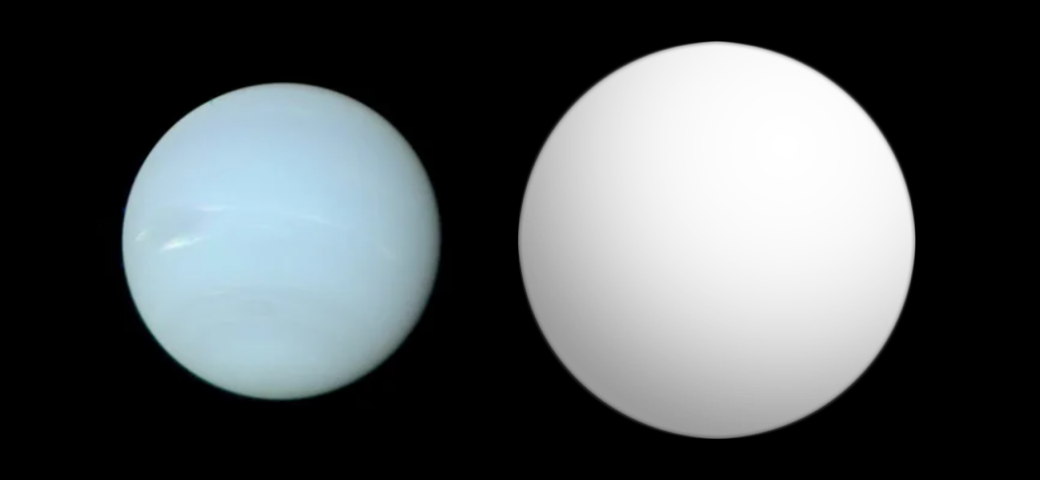
- Size comparison of Neptune with HAT-P-11b (gray).

Discovery
- Discovered by: Bakos et al.
- Discovery site: Cambridge, Massachusetts
- Discovery date: 2 January 2009
- Detection method: Transit (HATNet)

Orbital characteristics
- Apastron: 0.0637+0.0020 −0.0019 AU
- Periastron: 0.0413+0.0018 −0.0019 AU
- Semi-major axis: 0.05254+0.00064 −0.00066 AU
- Eccentricity: 0.218+0.034 −0.031
- Orbital period (sidereal): 4.887802443+0.000000034 −0.000000030 d
- Inclination: 89.05+0.15 −0.09
- Time of periastron: 2454957.15+0.17 −0.20
- Argument of periastron: 19+14 −16
- Semi-amplitude: 10.42+0.64 −0.66
- Star: HAT-P-11

Physical characteristics
- Mean radius: 4.36±0.06 R_{🜨}
- Mass: 23.4±1.5 M_{🜨}
- Mean density: 1.44 g/cm^{3}
- Surface gravity: 1.20 g

HAT-P-11b (or Kepler-3b) is an extrasolar planet orbiting the star HAT-P-11. It was discovered by the HATNet Project team in 2009 using the transit method, and submitted for publication on 2 January 2009.

This planet is located approximately 123 light-years (38 pc) distant from Earth.

== Discovery ==
The HATNet Project team initially detected the transits of HAT-P-11b from analysis of 11470 images, taken in 2004 and 2005, by the HAT-6 and HAT-9 telescopes. The planet was confirmed using 50 radial velocity measurements taken with the HIRES radial velocity spectrometer at W. M. Keck Observatory.

At the time of its discovery HAT-P-11b was the smallest radius transiting extrasolar planet discovered by a ground based transit search and was also one of three previously known transiting planets within the initial field of view of the Kepler spacecraft.

There was a linear trend in the radial velocities indicating the possibility of another planet in the system. This planet, HAT-P-11c, was confirmed in 2018.

== Characteristics ==
This planet orbits about the same distance from the star as Dimidium is from Helvetios, typical of transiting planets. However, the orbit of this planet is eccentric, at around 0.198, unusually high for hot Neptunes. HAT-P-11b's orbit is also highly inclined, with a tilt of 103^{+26}_{−10}°. degrees relative to its star's rotation. The planet is probably composed primarily of heavy elements with only 10% hydrogen and helium by mass, like Awohali.

On 24 September 2014, NASA reported that HAT-P-11b is the first Neptune-sized exoplanet known to have a relatively cloud-free atmosphere and, as well, the first time molecules, namely water vapor, of any kind have been found on such a relatively small exoplanet.

In 2009 French astronomers observed what was thought to be a weak unpolarized radio signal coming from the exoplanet, but it was not observed in a repeat observation in 2010. If the signal was real, then it was probably due to intense lightning storms with similar properties as ones on Saturn.

In December 2021 evidence of a magnetosphere was discovered in HAT-P-11b that could be the first ever in any exoplanet.

== See also ==
- Awohali
- HATNet Project
- HAT-P-7b
- Kepler Mission
- Tau Boötis b another extra solar planet with evidence of magnetic fields
- YZ Ceti another extra solar planet with evidence of magnetic fields
- HD 209458 b another extra solar planet with evidence of magnetic fields
