= Hot Neptune =

Large planet orbiting close to a star

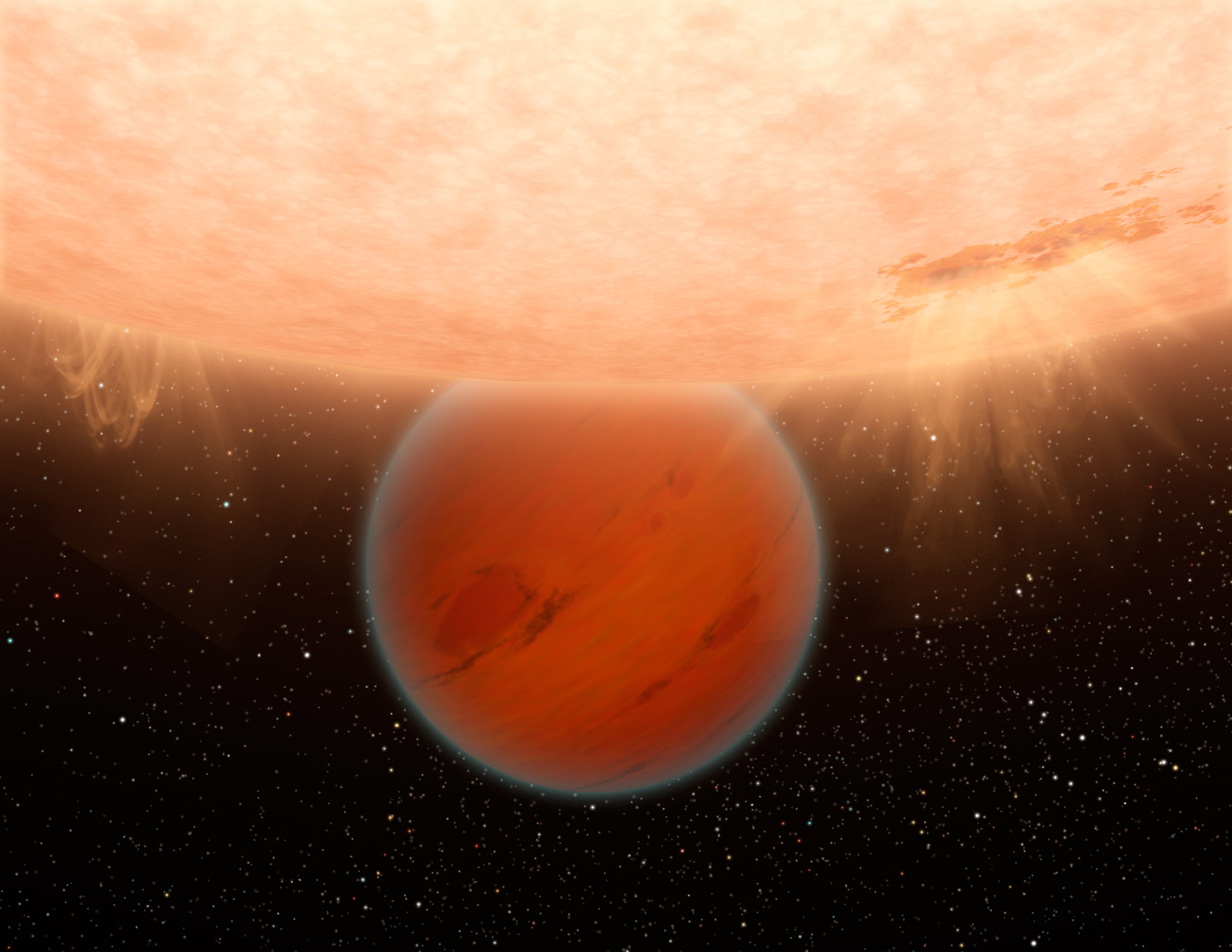
Artist's conception of Gliese 436 b, an example of a hot Neptune.

A hot Neptune is a type of giant planet with a mass similar to that of Neptune or Uranus orbiting close to its star, normally within less than 1 AU. The first hot Neptune to be discovered with certainty was Gliese 436 b (Awohali) in 2007, an exoplanet about 33 light years away. Recent observations have revealed a larger potential population of hot Neptunes in the Milky Way than was previously thought. Hot Neptunes may have formed either in situ or ex situ.

== General characteristics ==
Because of their close proximity to their parent stars, hot Neptunes have a much greater rate and chance of transiting their star as seen from a farther outlying point, than planets of the same mass in larger orbits. This increases the chances of discovering them by transit-based observation methods.

Transiting hot Neptunes include Gliese 436 b (Awohali) and HAT-P-11b. Gliese 436 b was the first hot Neptune to be discovered with certainty in 2007. The exoplanet Mu Arae c (Dulcinea) discovered in 2004 might also be a hot Neptune, but it has not been determined definitively. Another may be Kepler-56b, which has a mass somewhat larger than Neptune's and orbits its star at 0.1 AU, closer than Mercury orbits the Sun.

The first theoretical study of how hot Neptunes could form was carried out in 2004. If these planets formed ex situ, i.e., by migrating to their current locations while growing, they may contain large quantities of frozen volatiles and amorphous ices. Otherwise, if they formed in situ, their inventory of heavy elements should be made entirely of refractory materials. Yet, regardless of the mode of formation, hot Neptunes should contain large fractions (by mass) of gases, primarily hydrogen and helium, which also account for most of their volume.

== Ultra-hot Neptune ==
LTT 9779 b (Cuancoá) is the first ultra-hot Neptune discovered with an orbital period of 19 hours and an atmospheric temperature of over 1700 degrees Celsius. Being so close to its star and with a mass around twice that of Neptune, its atmosphere should have evaporated into space so its existence requires an unusual explanation. A candidate planet around Vega slightly more massive than Neptune was detected in 2021. It orbits Vega, an A-class star, every 2.43 days, and with a temperature of about 2500 degrees Celsius would be the second-hottest planet on record if confirmed.

== See also ==
- Ice giant – Type of giant planet
- Neptunian exoplanet – Type of exoplanet
- Helium planet – Planet with helium-dominated atmosphere
- Hot Jupiter – Gas giant planet orbiting close to a star
- Mini-Neptune – Planet smaller than Neptune with a low density envelope
- Neptunian desert – Region around stars where hot Neptunes are rare
- Ocean world – Planet containing a significant amount of water or other liquid
- Hycean planet – Water-covered planet with a hydrogen-rich atmosphere
- Super-Earth – Type of exoplanet larger than Earth

== Sources ==
- Gillon; et al. (September 2007). "Detection of transits of the nearby hot Neptune GJ 436 b". Astronomy and Astrophysics. 472 (2): L13–L16. arXiv:0705.2219. Bibcode:2007A&A...472L..13G. doi:10.1051/0004-6361:20077799. S2CID 13552824.
- Paul Gilster (16 May 2007). "Transiting 'Hot Neptune' Found". Centauri Dreams. A discussion of the "Detection of transits of the nearby hot Neptune GJ 436 b" paper.
