= NGTS-4b =

Neptune-like planet nicknamed the "forbidden planet"

Discovery
- Discovered by: Watson et al.
- Discovery site: Next-Generation Transit Survey, Paranal Observatory, Chile
- Discovery date: 2019
- Detection method: Transit

Designations
- Alternative names: TOI-1926 b

Orbital characteristics
- Semi-major axis: 0.019±0.005 AU
- Eccentricity: 0
- Orbital period (sidereal): 1.3373508±0.000008 days
- Inclination: 82.5°±5.8°
- Star: NGTS-4

Physical characteristics
- Mean radius: 0.2837±0.0232 R_{J}
- Mass: 0.0648±0.009 M_{J}

NGTS-4b is a Neptune-like planet orbiting the early K-type star NGTS-4, nicknamed the "forbidden planet" for its existence within the Neptunian desert, a location where very few Neptunian planets are found orbiting their stars. It was the first exoplanet discovered in the Neptunian desert.

== Characteristics ==
NGTS-4b has a mass of 20 M_{🜨}, and a radius 20% smaller than Neptune and has retained an atmosphere while orbiting every 1.3 days within the Neptunian desert of its star. The atmosphere may have survived due to the planet's unusually high core mass, or "it might have migrated to its current close-in orbit after this epoch of maximum stellar activity".

=== Host star ===
NGTS-4b orbits NGTS-4, a K-dwarf star located 922 light-years from Earth.
