= Gliese 436 b =

Hot Neptune exoplanet orbiting Gliese 436

Gliese 436 b / Awohali
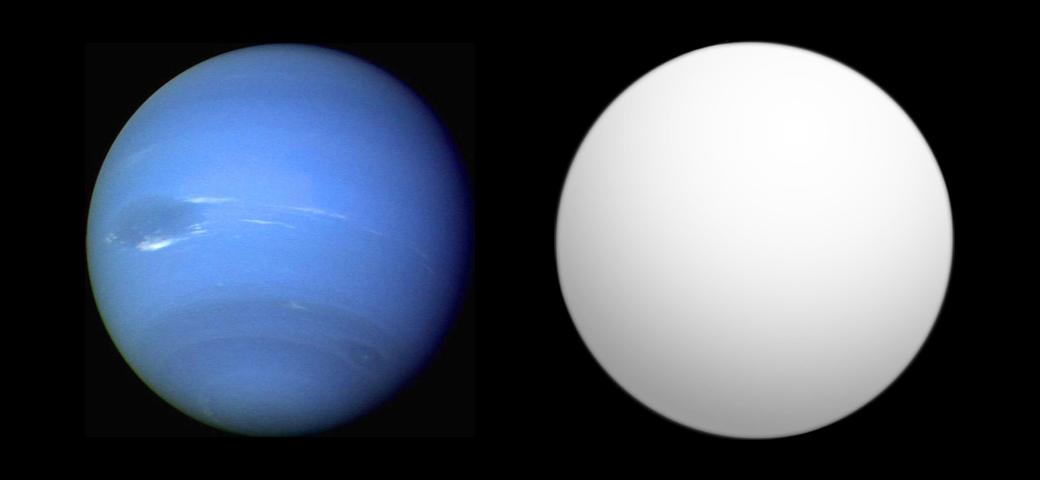
- Size comparison of Gliese 436 b with Neptune

Discovery
- Discovered by: Butler, Vogt, Marcy et al.
- Discovery site: California, USA
- Discovery date: August 31, 2004
- Detection method: Radial velocity, Transit

Designations
- Alternative names: Awohali

Orbital characteristics
- Semi-major axis: 0.028±0.001 AU
- Eccentricity: 0.152+0.009 −0.008
- Orbital period (sidereal): 2.64389803(26) d
- Inclination: 86.858°+0.049° −0.052°
- Time of periastron: 2451552.077
- Argument of periastron: 325.8°+5.5° −5.7°
- Semi-amplitude: 17.38±0.17 m/s
- Star: Gliese 436

Physical characteristics
- Mean radius: 4.10±0.16 R_{🜨}
- Mass: 21.36+0.20 −0.21 M_{🜨}
- Mean density: 1.71 g/cm^{3}
- Surface gravity: 1.27 g
- Albedo: ≤0.66 (Bond)
- Temperature: 662.8±5.0 K (389.6 °C; 733.4 °F, dayside)

Gliese 436 b /ˈɡliːzə/ (sometimes called GJ 436 b, formally named Awohali) is a Neptune-sized exoplanet orbiting the red dwarf Gliese 436 (Noquisi), 31.9 light-years from Earth. It is the only known planet in its system. It was the first hot Neptune discovered with certainty (in 2007) and was among the smallest-known transiting planets in mass and radius, until the much smaller Kepler exoplanet discoveries began circa 2010.

In December 2013, NASA reported that clouds may have been detected in the atmosphere of GJ 436 b.

== Discovery ==
Gliese 436 b was discovered in August 2004 by R. Paul Butler and Geoffrey Marcy of the Carnegie Institute of Washington and University of California, Berkeley, respectively, using the radial velocity method. Together with 55 Cancri e, it was the first of a new class of planets with a minimum mass (M sini) similar to Neptune.

The planet was recorded to transit its star by an automatic process at NMSU on January 11, 2005, but this event went unheeded at the time. In 2007, Michael Gillon from Geneva University in Switzerland led a team that observed the transit, grazing the stellar disc relative to Earth. Transit observations led to the determination of its exact mass and radius, both of which are very similar to that of Neptune, making Gliese 436 b at that time the smallest known transiting extrasolar planet. The planet is about four thousand kilometers larger in diameter than Uranus and five thousand kilometers larger than Neptune and slightly more massive. Gliese 436 b orbits at a distance of four million kilometers or one-fifteenth the average distance of Mercury from the Sun.

== Naming ==
In August 2022, this planet and its host star were included among 20 systems to be named by the third NameExoWorlds project. The approved names, proposed by a team from the United States, were announced in June 2023. Gliese 436 b is named Awohali and its host star is named Noquisi, after the Cherokee words for "eagle" and "star". As stated in the IAU naming citation, the name refers to a Cherokee legend, alluding to the planet's evaporating atmosphere:

“Awohali” (ᎠᏬᎭᎵ, Ah-Wo-Ha-Lee) is one of the Cherokee words for “eagle”. According to Cherokee legend, an eagle flew to the Sun to deliver a prayer for a warrior. In delivering the prayer to the Sun, the Sun kissed the tail feather of the eagle and had him return the feather to the warrior as a symbol of the connection between his people and the Great Spirit. Awohali’s sun-kissed tail feather alludes to the comet-like cloud of evaporating atmosphere detected around the exoplanet GJ 436 b.

== Physical characteristics ==
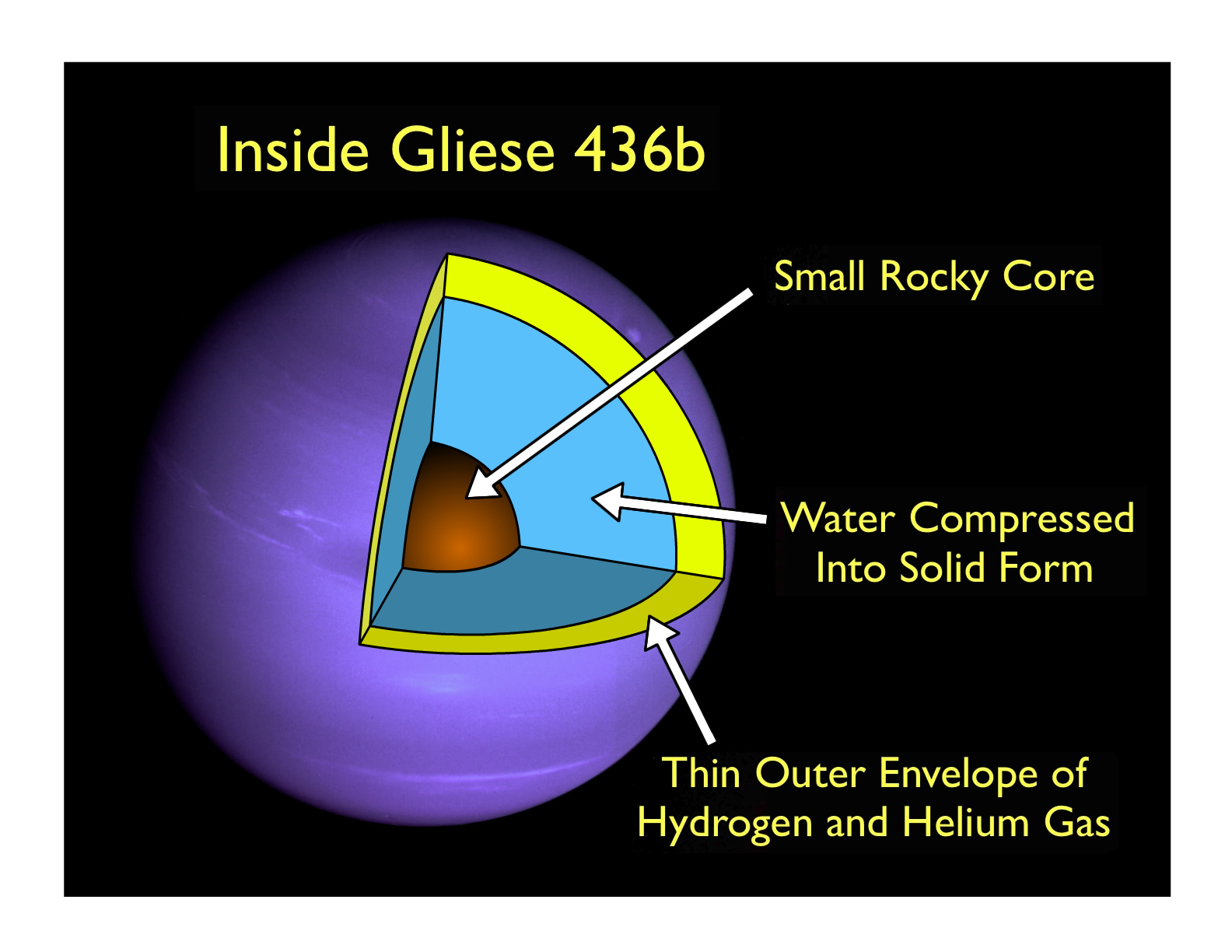
Possible interior structure of Gliese 436 b

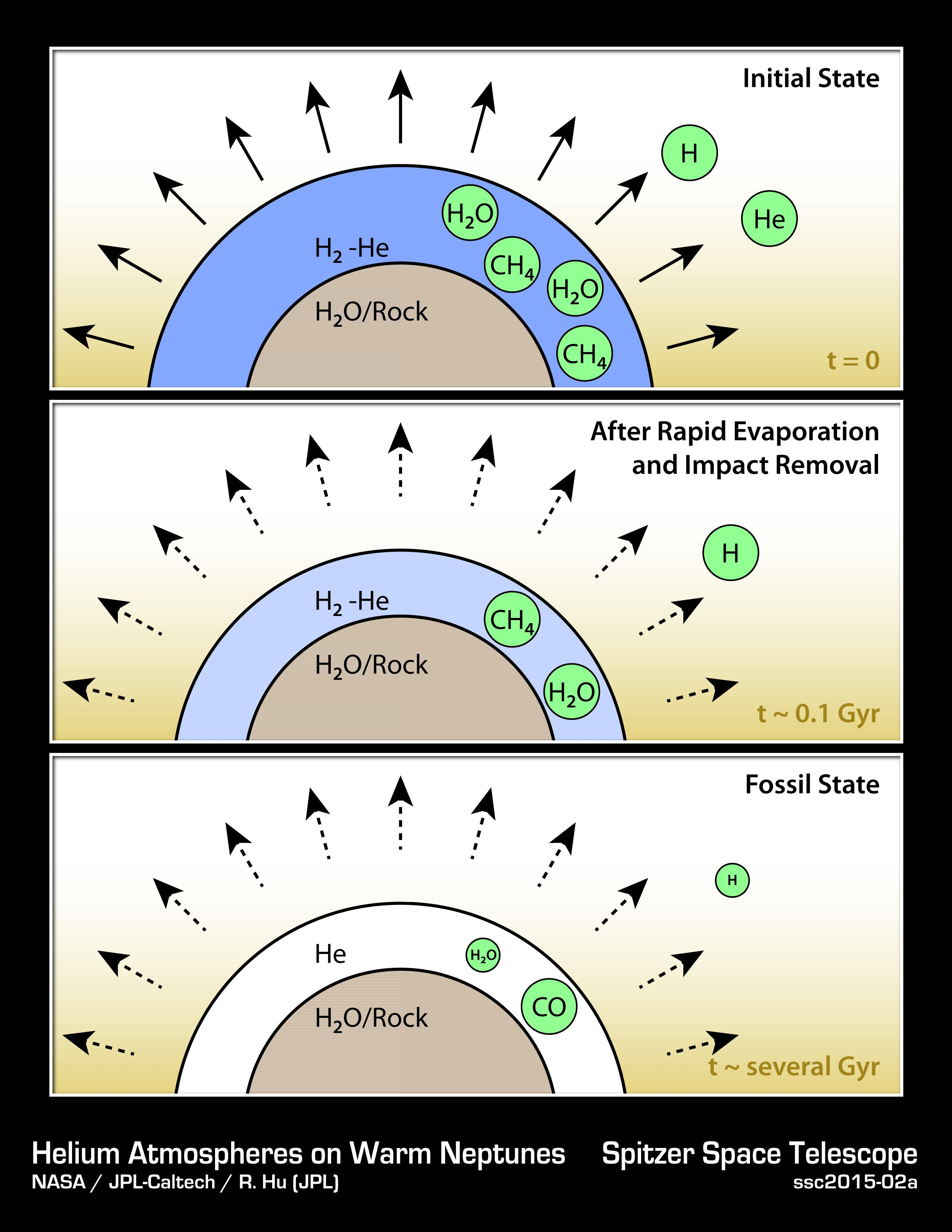
Formation of a helium atmosphere on a helium planet, possibly like Gliese 436 b.

The planet's surface temperature is estimated from measurements taken as it passes behind the star to be 712 K (439 °C; 822 °F). This temperature is significantly higher than would be expected if the planet were only heated by radiation from its star, which was prior to this measurement, estimated at 520 K. Whatever energy tidal effects deliver to the planet, it does not affect its temperature significantly. A greenhouse effect would result in a much greater temperature than the predicted 520–620 K.

Its main constituent was initially predicted to be hot "ice" in various exotic high-pressure forms, which would remain solid despite the high temperatures, because of the planet's gravity. The planet could have formed further from its current position, as a gas giant, and migrated inwards with the other gas giants. As it approached its present position, radiation from the star would have blown off the planet's hydrogen layer via coronal mass ejection.

However, when the radius became better known, ice alone was not enough to account for the observed size. An outer layer of hydrogen and helium, accounting for up to ten percent of the mass, was needed on top of the ice to account for the observed planetary radius. This obviates the need for an ice core. Alternatively, the planet may consist of a dense rocky core surrounded by a lesser amount of hydrogen.

Observations of the planet's brightness temperature with the Spitzer Space Telescope suggest a possible thermochemical disequilibrium in the atmosphere of this exoplanet. Results published in Nature suggest that Gliese 436 b’s dayside atmosphere is abundant in CO and deficient in methane (CH_{4}) by a factor of ~7,000. This result is unexpected because, based on current models at its temperature, atmospheric carbon should prefer CH_{4} over CO. In part for this reason, it has also been hypothesized to be a possible helium planet.

In June 2015, scientists reported that the atmosphere of Gliese 436 b was evaporating, resulting in a giant cloud around the planet and, due to radiation from the host star, a long trailing tail 14×10^{6} km (9×10^{6} mi) long.

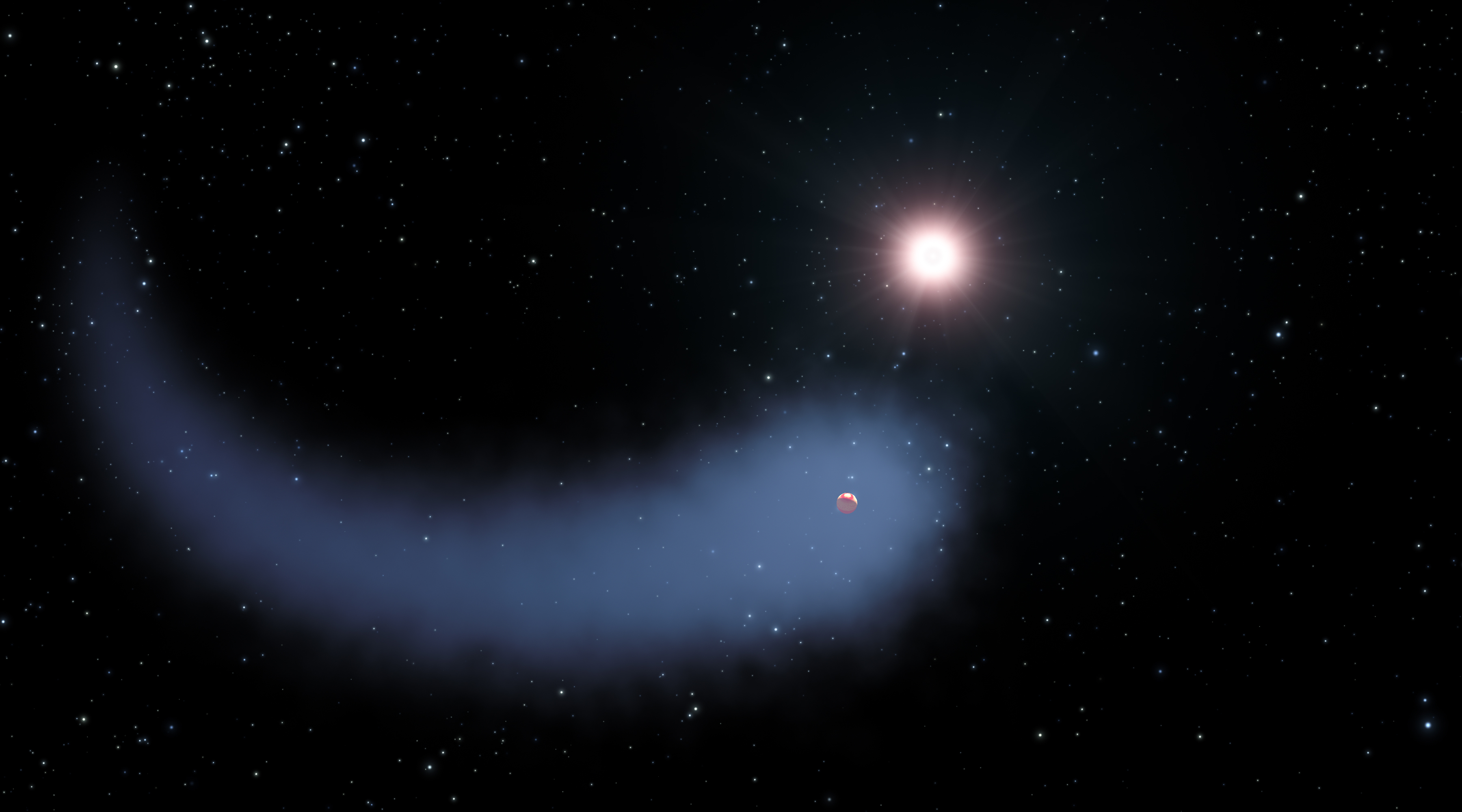
Artist impression of Gliese 436b shows the enormous comet-like cloud of hydrogen boiling off.

== Orbital characteristics ==
One orbit around the star takes only about two days, 15.5 hours. Gliese 436 b orbit is likely misaligned with its star's rotation. The eccentricity of Gliese 436 b’s orbit is inconsistent with models of planetary system evolution. To have maintained its eccentricity over time requires that it be accompanied by another planet.

A study published in Nature found that the orbit of Gliese 436 b is nearly perpendicular (inclined by 103.2^{+12.8}_{−11.5} degrees) to the stellar equator of Noquisi and suggests that the eccentricity and misalignment of the orbit could have resulted from interactions with a yet undetected companion. The inward migration caused by this interaction could have triggered the atmospheric escape that sustains its giant exosphere.

== See also ==
- 55 Cancri e
- Gliese 581 b
- Gliese 876 d
- HAT-P-11b

== Selected media articles ==
- How Do Artists Portray Exoplanets They've Never Seen? 4/9, Scientific American October 2, 2007.
- Astronomers Detect Shadow Of Water World In Front Of Nearby Star (from Science Daily).
