= EF Eridani =

Star in the constellation Eridanus

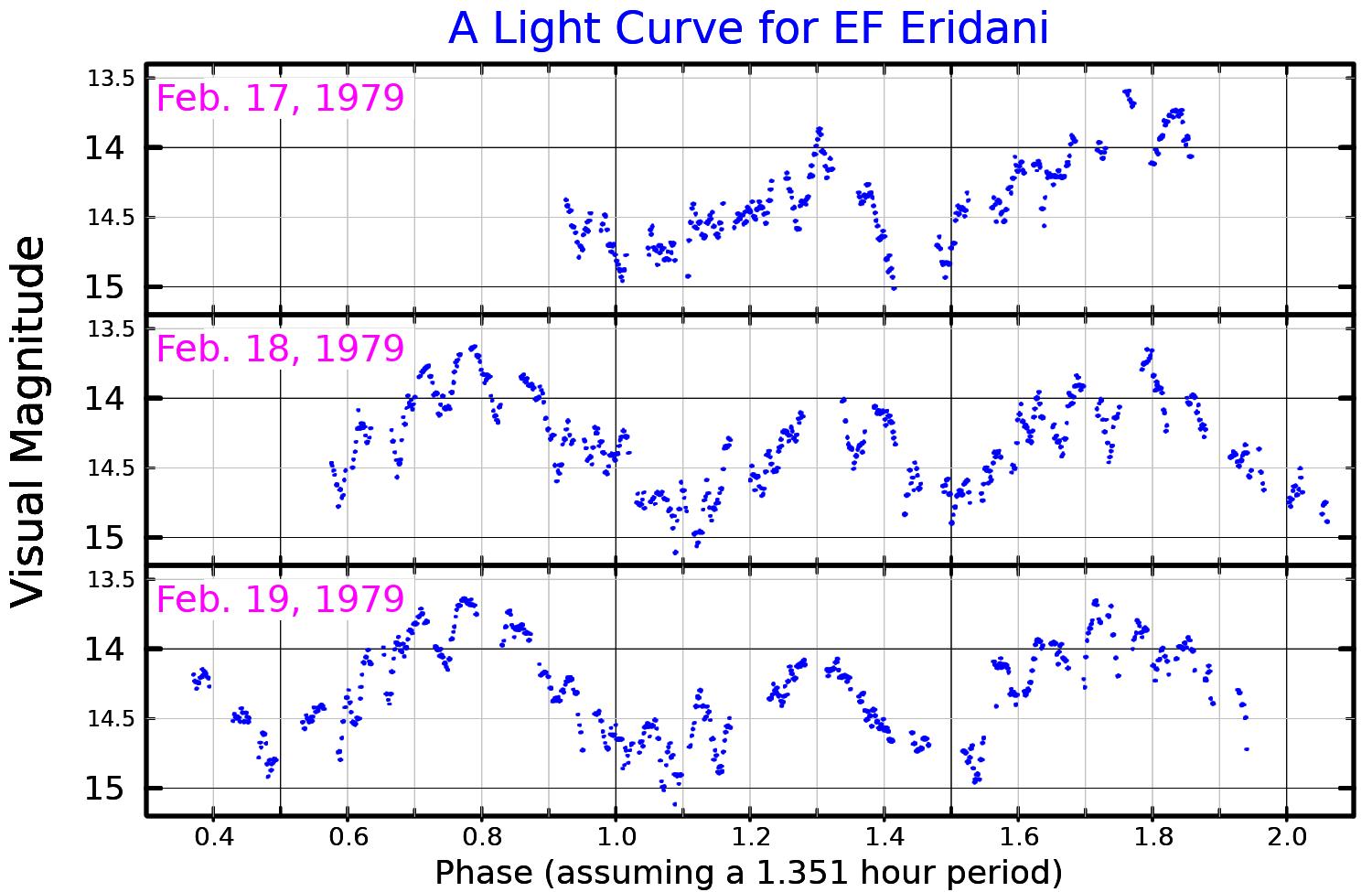
- Visual band light curves for EF Eridani, adapted from Williams and Hiltner (1980)

Observation data Epoch J2000.0 Equinox ICRS
- Constellation: Eridanus
- Right ascension: 03^{h} 14^{m} 13.25262^{s}
- Declination: −22° 35′ 42.9001″
- Apparent magnitude (V): 14.5–17.3

Characteristics
- Evolutionary stage: white dwarf
- Spectral type: DA
- Variable type: E + XM

Astrometry
Radial velocity (R_{v})	70 km/s
Proper motion (μ)	RA: 137.993 mas/yr Dec.: -55.971 mas/yr
Parallax (π)	6.2327±0.1417 mas
Distance	520 ± 10 ly (160 ± 4 pc)

Other designations
- GSC 6439.00120, X 03116-227

Database references
SIMBAD	data

EF Eridani (abbreviated EF Eri, sometimes incorrectly referred to as EF Eridanus) is a variable star of the type known as polars, AM Herculis stars, or magnetic cataclysmic variable stars. Historically it has varied between apparent magnitudes 14.5 and 17.3, although since 1995 it has generally remained at the lower limit. The star system consists of a white dwarf with a substellar-mass former star in orbit.

== EF Eridani B ==
The substellar mass in orbit around the white dwarf is a star that lost all of its gas to the white dwarf. What remains is an object with a mass of 0.05 solar masses (M_{☉}), or about 53 Jupiter masses (M_{J}), which is too small to continue fusion, and does not have the composition of a super-Jupiter, brown dwarf, or white dwarf. In fact, this stellar remnant doesn't fit into any commonly used category, and is as such essentially unique.

It is hypothesized that 500 million years ago, the white dwarf started to cannibalize its partner, when they were separated by 7 million km. As it lost mass, the regular star spiraled inward. Today, they are separated by a mere 700,000 km for an orbital period of 81 min. The orbit is expected to continue to shrink due to gravitational radiation.

== See also ==
- AM Herculis
- Cataclysmic variable star
- Polar (cataclysmic variable)
- Variable stars
- Stellar remnants
- PSR J1719-1438 b, a planetary-mass former star that was eroded by its binary star partner, PSR J1719-1438
- PSR J1544+4937 b
- PSR B1957+20 b
