= WASP-103b =

Hot Jupiter orbiting WASP-103

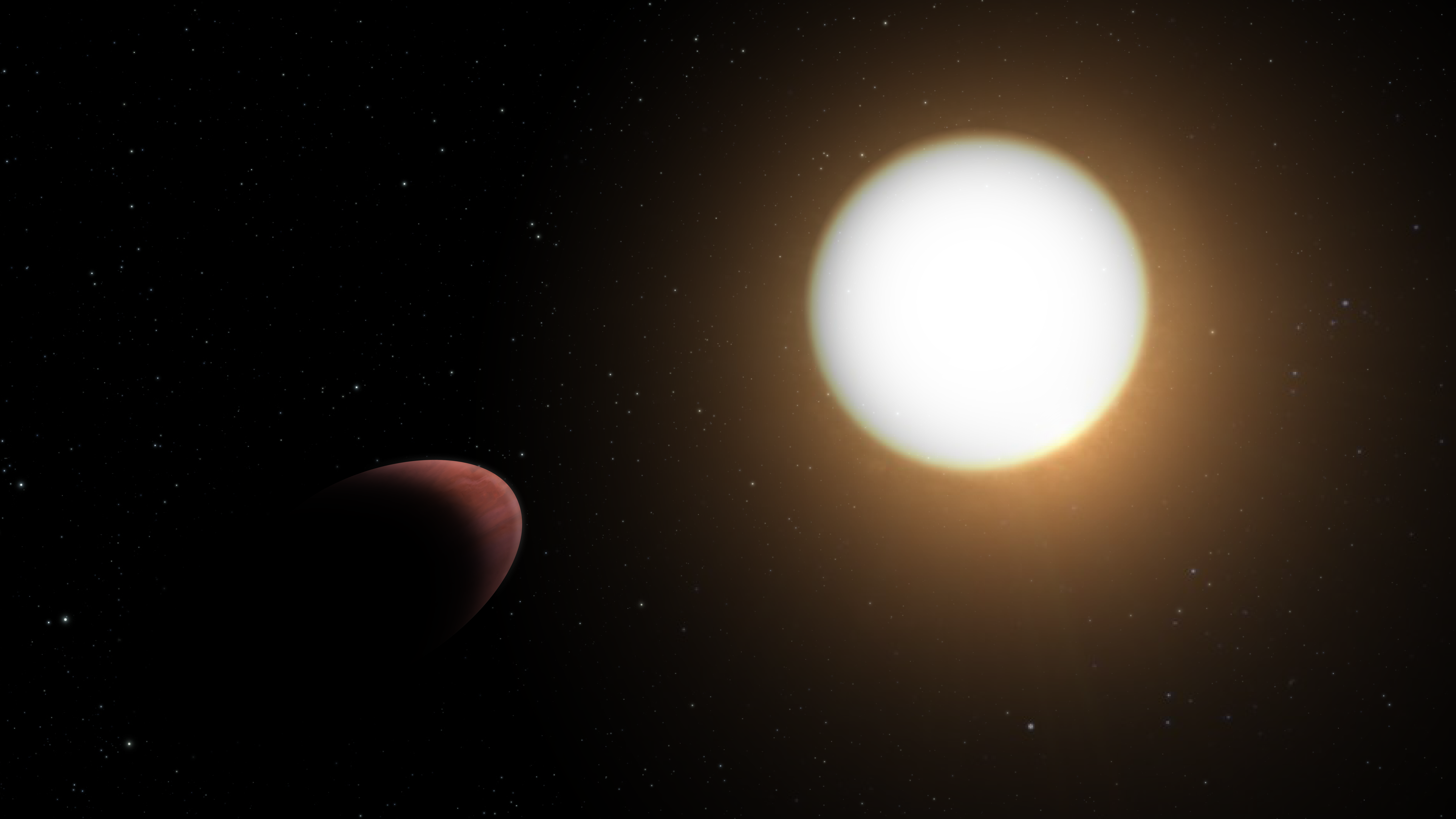
- Artist impression of planet WASP-103b and its host star

Discovery
- Discovered by: M. Gillon, et al.
- Discovery site: SuperWASP
- Discovery date: January 2014
- Detection method: Transit

Orbital characteristics
- Semi-major axis: 0.01987+0.00020 −0.00021 AU
- Eccentricity: <0.15
- Orbital period (sidereal): 0.9255456 ± 0.0000013 d (22.213094 ± 3.1×10^{−5} h)
- Inclination: 86.3°±2.7°
- Semi-amplitude: 268±15 m/s
- Star: WASP-103

Physical characteristics
- Mean radius: 1.528+0.073 −0.047 R_{J}
- Mass: 1.455+0.090 −0.091 M_{J}
- Mean density: 0.511+0.068 −0.073 g/cm^{3}

WASP-103b is an ultra-hot Jupiter orbiting around WASP-103, a late F8V-type main sequence star located in the Constellation of Hercules. It orbits at a distance of 0.019 AU with an eccentricity of 0.15. It significantly larger than Jupiter being roughly 1.5 times its mass and 1.6 times its radius. The planet has an oval shape similar to that of a rugby ball. This is due to the force of gravity exerted by its parent star. It is the first exoplanet to have a deformation detected.

== Discovery ==
WASP-103b was discovered by Gillon et al. (2014) in the year 2014 via the transit method. The star WASP-103 was observed by the southern station of the WASP (Wide Angle Search for Planets) survey during three observing seasons conducted in 2010 from May 15 to August 16, 2011 from March 26 to August 20 and 2012 from March 25 to June 28. The star was considered a high-priority candidate target due to the presence of a transit-like signal that occurred every ~0.926 days. Follow-up observations would then be done on the star with the TRAnsiting Planets and PlanetesImals Small Telescope (TRAPPIST). These follow-up observations observed three transits.

== Orbit ==
WASP-103b is a ultrashort period (USP) planet that orbits at a distance of 0.01986 astronomical units (AU) taking only 22.2 hours to complete an orbit around its parent star. It has an orbital eccentricity of 0.15.

=== Orbital decay ===
WASP-103b is a strong candidate to be effected by tidally-induced orbital decay. Birkby et al. (2014) calculated that orbital decay, if present in several close-in planets including WASP-103b, would cause a shift in the transit time of the planet over a period of around a decade. The detection of such shifts in transit time would require precise observations of WASP-103b occurring over many years along with ephemeris against which to measure deviations from strict periodicity. A study carried out by Patra et al. (2020) aimed to detect evidence for orbital decay in several hot Jupiters including WASP-103b. However none of the planets observed in the study, except for WASP-12b and possibly WASP-19b, showed convincing evidence of orbital decay. However further observations of these planets have been encouraged.

Despite orbiting very close to its parent star, it seems that WASP-103b is moving away from it, instead of getting closer. This gives rise to the theory that it is a binary system, or that the orbit of the exoplanet in question is elliptical.

== Characteristics ==
WASP-103b is significantly more massive than Jupiter being 1.49 times more massive with a radius of about 1.603 ±0.052 Jupiter radii. It experiences extreme irradiation from its parent star at ~9x10^{9} ergs s^{-1} cm^{-2}. The temperature of WASP-103b ranges from day to night with the dayside being significantly hotter than the night. It has a temperature of 2930 ±40 Kelvin and an nightside temperature of 1880 ±40 K. This would make this planet around twenty times hotter than Jupiter. This data would suggest that WASP-103b has an interior structure similar to Jupiter.

The Southern African Large Telescope (SALT) had observed marginal evidence for increased chromospheric activity on its parent star. If this turns out to be the case, this may suggest interactions between the star and planet.

=== Gravitational deformation ===
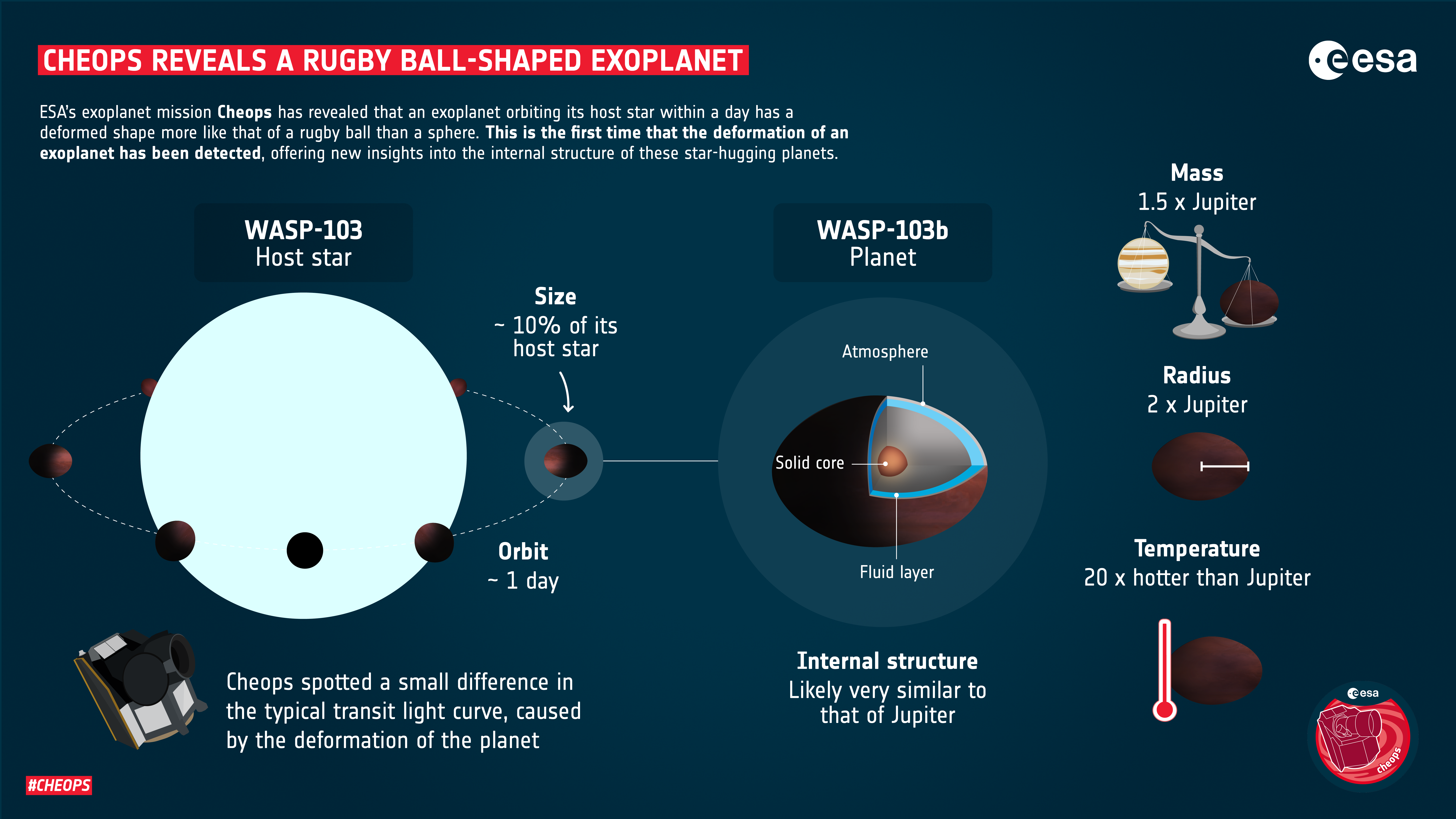
Illustration from ESA showing the tidal deformation of WASP-103b along some of its physical characteristics.

The gravitational pull from its host star leads to WASP-103b being tidally deformed into a shape that is similar to a Rugby ball. This is because WASP-103b has a Roche lobe filling factor of 0.58 which leads to the planet significantly deviating from its spherical shape. It is also possible that WASP-103b experiences mass loss due to Roche-lobe overflow. Either way, WASP-103b experiences extreme tidal deformation and is on the edge of tidal disruption which places it in a similar subgroup of ultrashort period gas giant exoplanets as OGLE-TR-56b.

=== Atmospheric composition ===
The planet is moderately metal-enriched being 100x times more enriched than its host star which has near-solar values. WASP-103b has large abundances of Iron(I) hydride (FeH), hydrides, Carbon dioxide, and Methane.

Observations of WASP-103b taken in 2018 from the Spitzer and Hubble Space Telescopes (HST) seemed to lack spectral features of water that is often attributed to partial water dissociation. If WASP-103b did it have water, it would have been in contrast to cooler hot Jupiters. However further observations from ground telescopes such as the Very Large Telescope (VLT) detected water in its atmosphere at low abundances. Those same observations were not able to rule out the presence of Sodium (Na). It also has a carbon-to-oxygen ratio that is below 0.9.

== See also ==
Examples of tidally stretched exoplanets with measured shapes include:

- WASP-12b, a hot Jupiter
- WASP-121b (named Tylos), another hot Jupiter
- PSR J2322−2650 b, a pulsar planet
