= Planetary core =

Innermost layer(s) of a planet

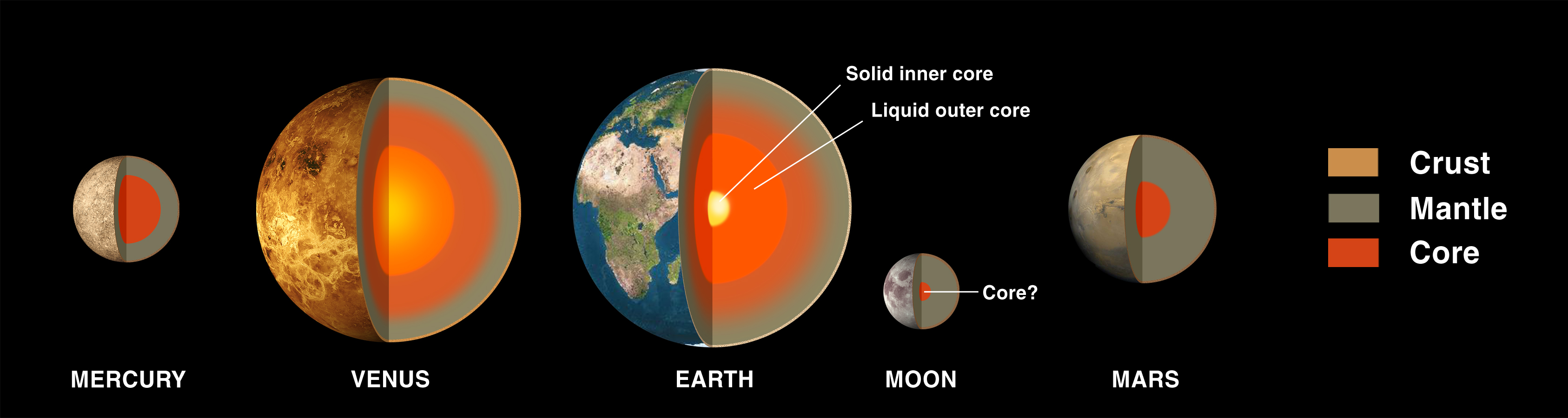
The internal structure of the inner planets.

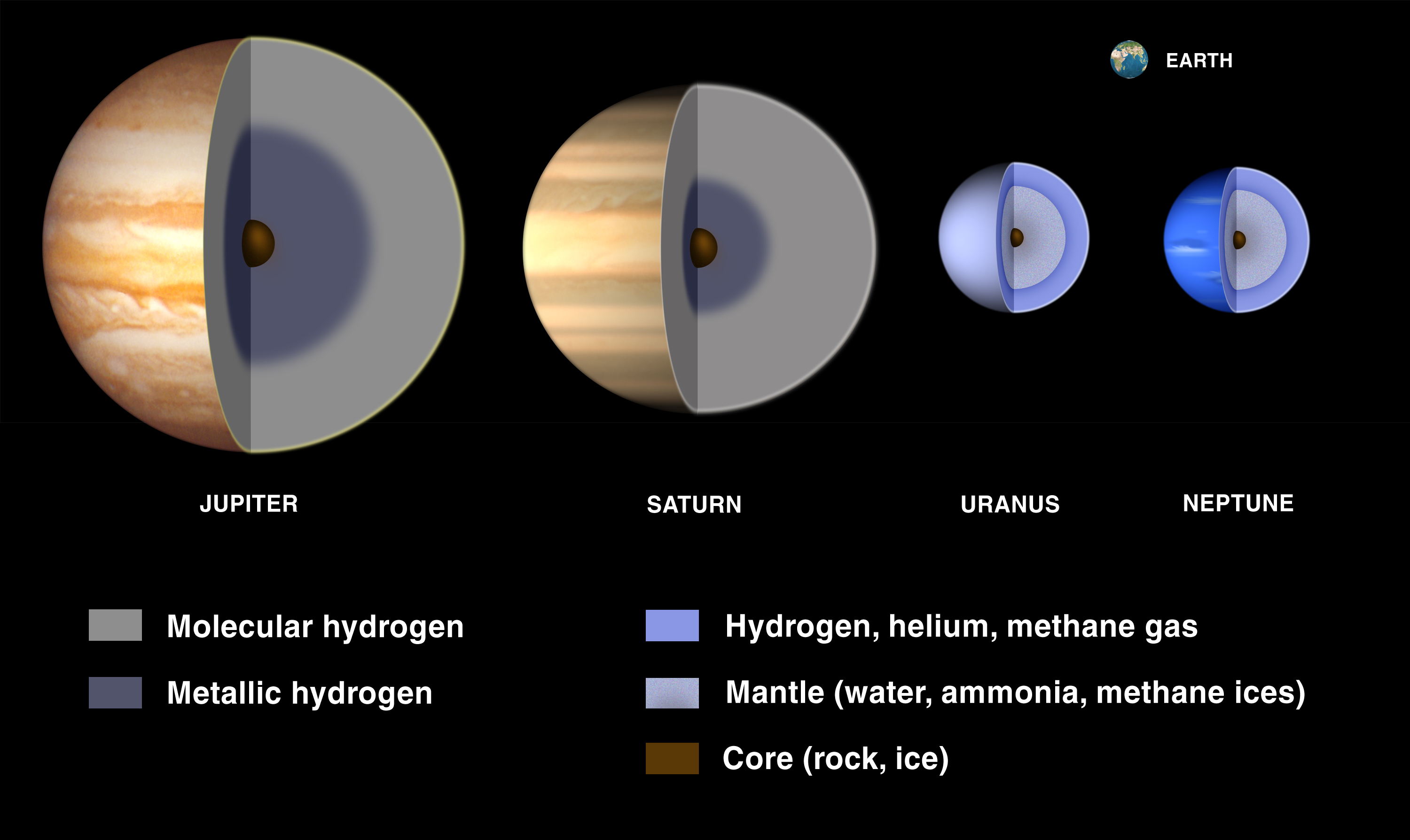
The internal structure of the outer planets. The color of Neptune is exaggerated to differentiate it from Uranus.

A planetary core consists of the innermost layers of a planet. Cores may be entirely liquid, or a mixture of solid and liquid layers as is the case in the Earth. In the Solar System, core sizes range from about 20% (the Moon) to 85% of a planet's radius (Mercury).

Gas giants also have cores, though the composition of these are still a matter of debate and range in possible composition from traditional stony/iron, to ice or to fluid metallic hydrogen. Gas giant cores are proportionally much smaller than those of terrestrial planets, though they can be considerably larger than the Earth's nevertheless; Jupiter's is 10–30 times heavier than Earth, and exoplanet HD 149026 b may have a core 100 times the mass of the Earth.

Planetary cores are challenging to study because they are impossible to reach by drill and there are almost no samples that are definitively from the core. Thus, they are studied via indirect techniques such as seismology, mineral physics, and planetary dynamics.

== Discovery ==
=== Earth's core ===
In 1797, Henry Cavendish calculated the average density of the Earth to be 5.48 times the density of water (later refined to 5.53), which led to the accepted belief that the Earth was much denser in its interior. Following the discovery of iron meteorites, Emil Wiechert in 1898 postulated that the Earth had a similar bulk composition to iron meteorites, but the iron had settled to the interior of the Earth, and later represented this by integrating the bulk density of the Earth with the missing iron and nickel as a core. The first detection of Earth's core occurred in 1906 by Richard Dixon Oldham upon discovery of the P-wave shadow zone; the liquid outer core. By 1936 seismologists had determined the size of the overall core as well as the boundary between the fluid outer core and the solid inner core.

=== Moon's core ===
The internal structure of the Moon was characterized in 1974 using seismic data collected by the Apollo missions of moonquakes. The Moon's core has a radius of 300 km. The Moon's iron core has a liquid outer layer that makes up 60% of the volume of the core, with a solid inner core.

=== Cores of the rocky planets ===
The cores of the rocky planets were initially characterized by analyzing data from spacecraft, such as NASA's Mariner 10 that flew by Mercury and Venus to observe their surface characteristics. The cores of other planets cannot be measured using seismometers on their surface, so instead they have to be inferred based on calculations from these fly-by observation. Mass and size can provide a first-order calculation of the components that make up the interior of a planetary body. The structure of rocky planets is constrained by the average density of a planet and its moment of inertia. The moment of inertia for a differentiated planet is less than 0.4, because the density of the planet is concentrated in the center. Mercury has a moment of inertia of 0.346, which is evidence for a core. Conservation of energy calculations as well as magnetic field measurements can also constrain composition, and surface geology of the planets can characterize differentiation of the body since its accretion. Mercury, Venus, and Mars’ cores are about 75%, 50%, and 40% of their radius respectively.

== Formation ==
=== Accretion ===
Planetary systems form from flattened disks of dust and gas that accrete rapidly (within thousands of years) into planetesimals around 10 km in diameter. From here gravity takes over to produce Moon- to Mars-sized planetary embryos over 0.1–1 million years, and these develop into planetary bodies over an additional 10–100 million years.

Jupiter and Saturn most likely formed around previously existing rocky and/or icy bodies, rendering these previous primordial planets into gas-giant cores. This is the planetary core accretion model of planet formation.

=== Differentiation ===
Planetary differentiation is broadly defined as the development from one thing to many things; homogeneous body to several heterogeneous components. The hafnium-182/tungsten-182 isotopic system has a half-life of 9 million years, and is approximated as an extinct system after 45 million years. Hafnium is a lithophile element and tungsten is siderophile element. Thus if metal segregation (between the Earth's core and mantle) occurred in under 45 million years, silicate reservoirs develop positive Hf/W anomalies, and metal reservoirs acquire negative anomalies relative to undifferentiated chondrite material. The observed Hf/W ratios in iron meteorites constrain metal segregation to under 5 million years, the Earth's mantle Hf/W ratio places Earth's core as having segregated within 25 million years. Several factors control segregation of a metal core including the crystallization of perovskite. Crystallization of perovskite in an early magma ocean is an oxidation process and may drive the production and extraction of iron metal from an original silicate melt.

=== Core merging and impacts ===
Impacts between planet-sized bodies in the early Solar System are important aspects in the formation and growth of planets and planetary cores.

==== Earth–Moon system ====
The giant impact hypothesis states that an impact between a theoretical Mars-sized planet Theia and the early Earth formed the modern Earth and Moon. During this impact the majority of the iron from Theia and the Earth became incorporated into the Earth's core.

==== Mars ====
Core merging between the proto-Mars and another differentiated protoplanet could have been as fast as 1000 years or as slow as 300,000 years (depending on viscosity of both cores).

== Chemistry ==
=== Determining primary composition – Earth ===
Using the chondritic reference model and combining known compositions of the crust and mantle, the unknown component, the composition of the inner and outer core, can be determined: 85% Fe, 5% Ni, 0.9% Cr, 0.25% Co, and all other refractory metals at very low concentration. This leaves Earth's core with a 5–10% weight deficit for the outer core, and a 4–5% weight deficit for the inner core; which is attributed to lighter elements that should be cosmically abundant and are iron-soluble; H, O, C, S, P, and Si. Earth's core contains half the Earth's vanadium and chromium, and may contain considerable niobium and tantalum. Earth's core is depleted in germanium and gallium.

=== Weight deficit components – Earth ===
Sulfur is strongly siderophilic and only moderately volatile and depleted in the silicate earth; thus may account for 1.9 weight % of Earth's core. By similar arguments, phosphorus may be present up to 0.2 weight %. Hydrogen and carbon, however, are highly volatile and thus would have been lost during early accretion and therefore can only account for 0.1 to 0.2 weight % respectively. Silicon and oxygen thus make up the remaining mass deficit of Earth's core; though the abundances of each are still a matter of controversy revolving largely around the pressure and oxidation state of Earth's core during its formation. No geochemical evidence exists to include any radioactive elements in Earth's core. Despite this, experimental evidence has found potassium to be strongly siderophilic at the temperatures associated with core formation, thus there is potential for potassium in planetary cores of planets, and therefore potassium-40 as well.

=== Isotopic composition – Earth ===
Hafnium/tungsten (Hf/W) isotopic ratios, when compared with a chondritic reference frame, show a marked enrichment in the silicate earth indicating depletion in Earth's core. Iron meteorites, believed to be resultant from very early core fractionation processes, are also depleted. Niobium/tantalum (Nb/Ta) isotopic ratios, when compared with a chondritic reference frame, show mild depletion in bulk silicate Earth and the moon.

=== Pallasite meteorites ===
Pallasites are thought to form at the core-mantle boundary of an early planetesimal, although a recent hypothesis suggests that they are impact-generated mixtures of core and mantle materials.

== Dynamics ==
=== Dynamo ===
Dynamo theory is a proposed mechanism to explain how celestial bodies like the Earth generate magnetic fields. The presence or lack of a magnetic field can help constrain the dynamics of a planetary core. Refer to Earth's magnetic field for further details. A dynamo requires a source of thermal and/or compositional buoyancy as a driving force. Thermal buoyancy from a cooling core alone cannot drive the necessary convection as indicated by modelling, thus compositional buoyancy (from changes of phase) is required. On Earth the buoyancy is derived from crystallization of the inner core (which can occur as a result of temperature). Examples of compositional buoyancy include precipitation of iron alloys onto the inner core and liquid immiscibility both, which could influence convection both positively and negatively depending on ambient temperatures and pressures associated with the host-body. Other celestial bodies that exhibit magnetic fields are Mercury, Jupiter, Ganymede, and Saturn.

=== Core heat source ===
A planetary core acts as a heat source for the outer layers of a planet. In the Earth, the heat flux over the core mantle boundary is 12 terawatts. This value is calculated from a variety of factors: secular cooling, differentiation of light elements, Coriolis forces, radioactive decay, and latent heat of crystallization. All planetary bodies have a primordial heat value, or the amount of energy from accretion. Cooling from this initial temperature is called secular cooling, and in the Earth the secular cooling of the core transfers heat into an insulating silicate mantle. As the inner core grows, the latent heat of crystallization adds to the heat flux into the mantle.

=== Stability and instability ===
Small planetary cores may experience catastrophic energy release associated with phase changes within their cores. Ramsey (1950) found that the total energy released by such a phase change would be on the order of 10^{29} joules; equivalent to the total energy release due to earthquakes through geologic time. Such an event could explain the asteroid belt. Such phase changes would only occur at specific mass to volume ratios, and an example of such a phase change would be the rapid formation or dissolution of a solid core component.

=== Trends in the Solar System ===
==== Inner rocky planets ====
All of the rocky inner planets, as well as the moon, have an iron-dominant core. Venus and Mars have an additional major element in the core. Venus’ core is believed to be iron-nickel, similarly to Earth. Mars, on the other hand, is believed to have an iron-sulfur core and is separated into an outer liquid layer around an inner solid core. As the orbital radius of a rocky planet increases, the size of the core relative to the total radius of the planet decreases. This is believed to be because differentiation of the core is directly related to a body's initial heat, so Mercury's core is relatively large and active. Venus and Mars, as well as the moon, do not have magnetic fields. This could be due to a lack of a convecting liquid layer interacting with a solid inner core, as Venus’ core is not layered. Although Mars does have a liquid and solid layer, they do not appear to be interacting in the same way that Earth's liquid and solid components interact to produce a dynamo.

==== Outer gas and ice giants ====
Modern understanding of the outer planets in the solar system, the ice and gas giants, theorized small cores of rock surrounded by a layer of ice, and in Jupiter and Saturn models suggest a large region of liquid metallic hydrogen and helium. However, this model is changing due to the discovery of diffuse, inhomogeneous cores that are not completely differentiated. The resulting conditions are more difficult to model properly. The properties of the metallic hydrogen layers is a major area of contention because it is difficult to produce in laboratory settings, due to the high pressures needed. Due to internal heating, Jupiter and Saturn appear to release a lot more energy than they should be radiating just from the sun, which is attributed to heat released by the hydrogen and helium layer. Uranus does not appear to have a significant heat source, but Neptune has a heat source that is attributed to a "hot" formation.

== Observed types ==
The following summarizes known information about the planetary cores of given non-stellar bodies.

=== Within the Solar System ===
==== Mercury ====
Mercury has an observed magnetic field, which is believed to be generated within its metallic core. Mercury's core occupies 85% of the planet's radius, making it the largest core relative to the size of the planet in the Solar System; this indicates that much of Mercury's surface may have been lost early in the Solar System's history. Mercury has a solid silicate crust and mantle overlying a solid metallic outer core layer, followed by a deeper liquid core layer, and then a possible solid inner core making a third layer. The composition of the iron-rich core remains uncertain, but it likely contains nickel, silicon and perhaps sulfur and carbon, plus trace amounts of other elements.

==== Venus ====
The composition of Venus' core varies significantly depending on the model used to calculate it, thus constraints are required.

| Element | Chondritic Model | Equilibrium Condensation Model | Pyrolitic Model |
|---|---|---|---|
| Iron | 88.6% | 94.4% | 78.7% |
| Nickel | 5.5% | 5.6% | 6.6% |
| Cobalt | 0.26% | Unknown | Unknown |
| Sulfur | 5.1% | 0% | 4.9% |
| Oxygen | 0% | Unknown | 9.8% |

==== Moon ====
The existence of a lunar core is still debated; however, if it does have a core it would have formed synchronously with the Earth's own core at 45 million years post-start of the Solar System based on hafnium-tungsten evidence and the giant impact hypothesis. Such a core may have hosted a geomagnetic dynamo early on in its history.

==== Earth ====
The Earth has an observed magnetic field generated within its metallic core. The Earth has a 5–10% mass deficit for the entire core and a density deficit from 4–5% for the inner core. The Fe/Ni value of the core is well constrained by chondritic meteorites. Sulfur, carbon, and phosphorus only account for ~2.5% of the light element component/mass deficit. No geochemical evidence exists for including any radioactive elements in the core. However, experimental evidence has found that potassium is strongly siderophile when dealing with temperatures associated with core-accretion, and thus potassium-40 could have provided an important source of heat contributing to the early Earth's dynamo, though to a lesser extent than on sulfur rich Mars. The core contains half the Earth's vanadium and chromium, and may contain considerable niobium and tantalum. The core is depleted in germanium and gallium. Core mantle differentiation occurred within the first 30 million years of Earth's history. Inner core crystallization timing is still largely unresolved.

==== Mars ====
Mars possibly hosted a core-generated magnetic field in the past. The dynamo ceased within 0.5 billion years of the planet's formation. Hf/W isotopes derived from the martian meteorite Zagami, indicate rapid accretion and core differentiation of Mars; i.e. under 10 million years. Potassium-40 could have been a major source of heat powering the early Martian dynamo.

Core merging between proto-Mars and another differentiated protoplanet could have been as fast as 1000 years or as slow as 300,000 years (depending on the viscosity of both cores and mantles). Impact-heating of the Martian core would have resulted in stratification of the core and kill the Martian dynamo for a duration between 150 and 200 million years. Modelling done by Williams, et al. 2004 suggests that in order for Mars to have had a functional dynamo, the Martian core was initially hotter by 150 K than the mantle (agreeing with the differentiation history of the planet, as well as the impact hypothesis), and with a liquid core potassium-40 would have had opportunity to partition into the core providing an additional source of heat. The model further concludes that the core of mars is entirely liquid, as the latent heat of crystallization would have driven a longer-lasting (greater than one billion years) dynamo. If the core of Mars is liquid, the lower bound for sulfur would be five weight %.

==== Ganymede ====
Ganymede has an observed magnetic field generated within its metallic core.

==== Jupiter ====
Jupiter has an observed magnetic field generated within its core, indicating some metallic substance is present. Its magnetic field is the strongest in the Solar System after the Sun's.

Jupiter has a rock and/or ice core 10–30 times the mass of the Earth, and this core is likely soluble in the gas envelope above, and so primordial in composition. Since the core still exists, the outer envelope must have originally accreted onto a previously existing planetary core. Thermal contraction/evolution models support the presence of metallic hydrogen within the core in large abundances (greater than Saturn).

==== Saturn ====
Saturn has an observed magnetic field generated within its metallic core. Metallic hydrogen is present within the core (in lower abundances than Jupiter). Saturn has a rock and or ice core 10–30 times the mass of the Earth, and this core is likely soluble in the gas envelope above, and therefore it is primordial in composition. Since the core still exists, the envelope must have originally accreted onto previously existing planetary cores. Thermal contraction/evolution models support the presence of metallic hydrogen within the core in large abundances (but still less than Jupiter).

==== Remnant planetary cores ====
Missions to bodies in the asteroid belt will provide more insight to planetary core formation. It was previously understood that collisions in the solar system fully merged, but recent work on planetary bodies argues that remnants of collisions have their outer layers stripped, leaving behind a body that would eventually become a planetary core. The Psyche mission, titled “Journey to a Metal World,” is aiming to studying a body that could possibly be a remnant planetary core.

=== Extrasolar ===
As the field of exoplanets grows as new techniques allow for the discovery of both diverse exoplanets, the cores of exoplanets are being modeled. These depend on initial compositions of the exoplanets, which is inferred using the absorption spectra of individual exoplanets in combination with the emission spectra of their star.

==== Chthonian planets ====
A chthonian planet results when a gas giant has its outer atmosphere stripped away by its parent star, likely due to the planet's inward migration. All that remains from the encounter is the original core.

==== Planets derived from stellar cores and diamond planets ====
Carbon planets, previously stars, are formed alongside the formation of a millisecond pulsar. The first such planet discovered was 18 times the density of water, and five times the size of Earth. Thus the planet cannot be gaseous, and must be composed of heavier elements that are also cosmically abundant like carbon and oxygen; making it likely crystalline like a diamond.

PSR J1719-1438 is a 5.7 millisecond pulsar found to have a companion with a mass similar to Jupiter but a density of 23 g/cm^{3}, suggesting that the companion is an ultralow mass carbon white dwarf, likely the core of an ancient star.

==== Hot ice planets ====
Exoplanets with moderate densities (more dense than Jovian planets, but less dense than terrestrial planets) suggests that such planets like GJ1214b and GJ436 are composed of primarily water. Internal pressures of such water-worlds would result in exotic phases of water forming on the surface and within their cores.
