= WASP-121b =

Hot Jupiter exoplanet orbiting WASP-121

WASP-121b / Tylos
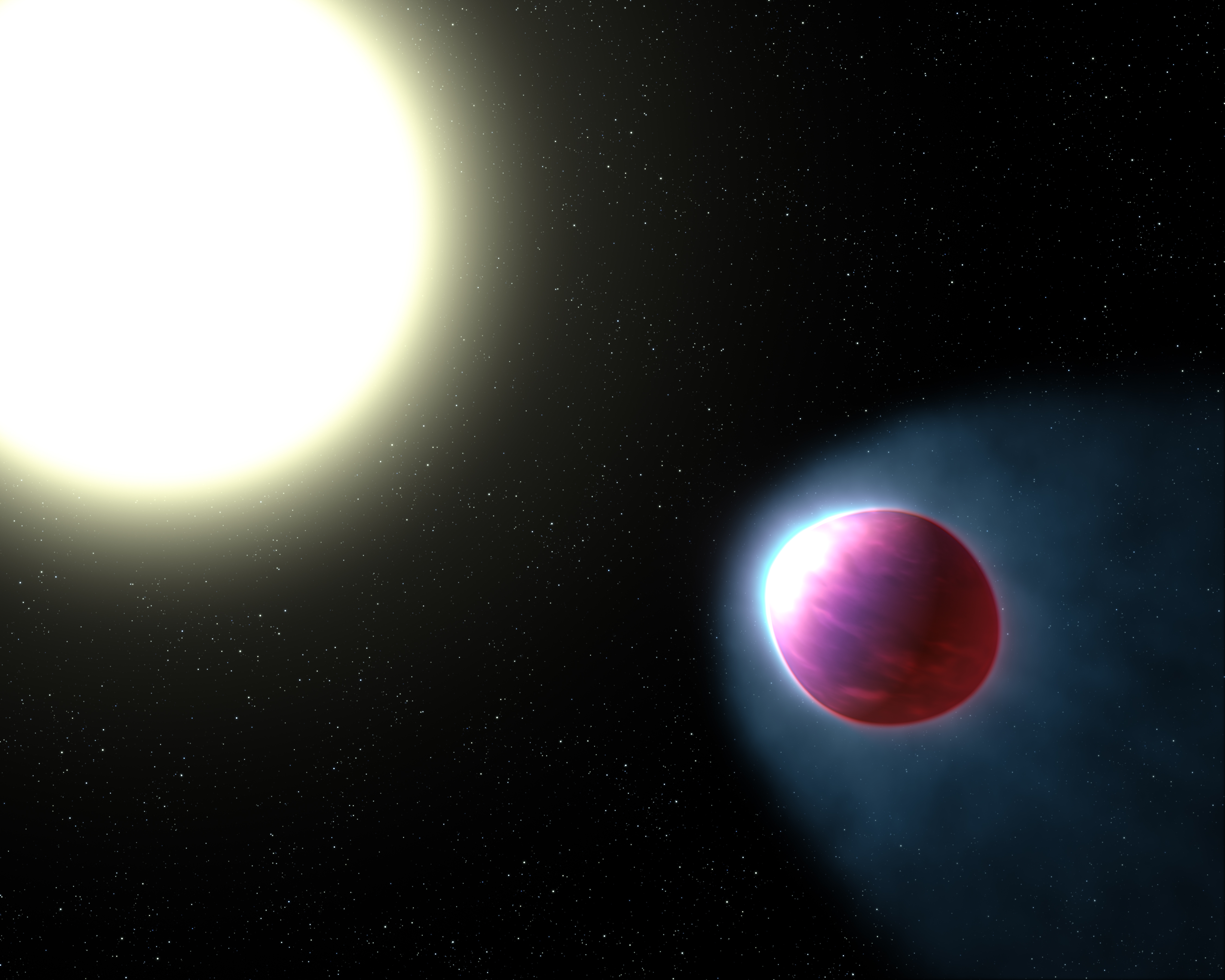
- Artist's impression of WASP-121b and its host star

Discovery
- Discovered by: L. Delrez et al.
- Discovery date: 2015
- Detection method: Transit

Designations
- Alternative names: Tylos

Orbital characteristics
- Semi-major axis: 0.02596+0.00043 −0.00063 AU
- Eccentricity: <0.0032
- Orbital period (sidereal): 1.27492504(15) d
- Inclination: 88.49°±0.16°
- Argument of periastron: 10°±10°
- Star: WASP-121

Physical characteristics
- Mean radius: 1.753±0.036 R_{J}
- Mass: 1.157±0.070 M_{J}
- Mean density: 0.266+0.024 −0.022 g/cm^{3}
- Surface gravity: 9.33+0.71 −0.67 m/s^{2} (0.95 g)
- Temperature: 2,602±53 K (2,329 °C; 4,224 °F)

WASP-121b, officially named Tylos, is an exoplanet orbiting the star WASP-121. WASP-121b is the first exoplanet found with an extrasolar planetary stratosphere (an atmospheric in which temperatures increase as the altitude increases) and the first that contains water. WASP-121b is in the constellation Puppis, and is about 858 light-years from Earth.

== Nomenclature ==
In August 2022, this planet and its host star were included among 20 systems to be named by the third NameExoWorlds project. The approved names, proposed by a team from Bahrain, were announced in June 2023. WASP-121b is named Tylos after the ancient Greek name for Bahrain, and its host star is named Dilmun after the ancient civilization.

== Characteristics ==
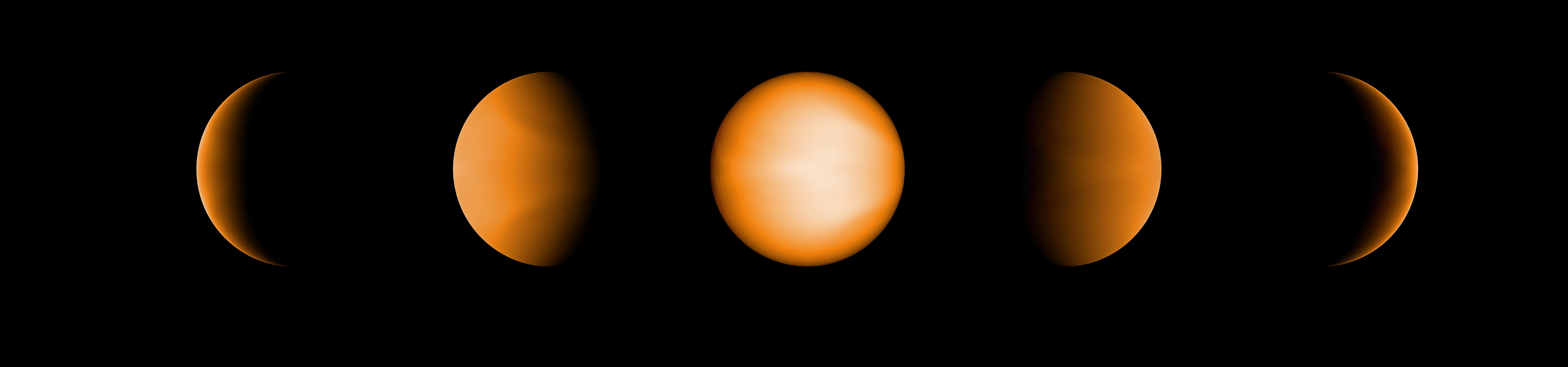
WASP-121b – computer simulated views (August 2018)

WASP-121b is an ultra-hot Jupiter exoplanet with a mass about 1.16 times that of Jupiter and a radius about 1.75 times that of Jupiter. The exoplanet orbits WASP-121, its host star, every 1.27 days.

In 2019 a work by Hellard et al. discussed the possibility of measuring the Love number of transiting hot Jupiters using HST (Hubble Space Telescope)/STIS. A tentative measurement of $h_2=1.4\pm0.8$ for WASP-121b was published in the same work.

The planetary orbit is inclined to the equatorial plane of the star by 8.1°.

In 2026, astronomers detected strong evidence for the magnetic field for seven ultra-hot Jupiters, including WASP-121b, which based on the measurement of their global wind speeds between dayside and nightside. Their magnetosphere $B$ values are comparable to that of Jupiter and Saturn.

=== Atmospheric composition ===
A spectral survey in 2015 attributed 2,500 °C (4,530 °F), hot stratosphere-absorption bands to water molecules, titanium(II) oxide (TiO) and vanadium(II) oxide (VO). Neutral iron was also detected in the stratosphere of WASP-121b in 2020, along with neutral chromium and vanadium. A number of other studies, however, failed to detect TiO and VO.

Reanalysis of collected spectral data was published in June 2020. Neutral magnesium, calcium, vanadium, chromium, iron (Fe) and nickel (Ni), along with ionized sodium atoms, were detected. However, the low quality of available data precluded a positive identification of any molecular species, including water. The atmosphere appears to be significantly out of chemical equilibrium and possibly escaping. The strong atmospheric flows beyond the Roche lobe, indicating ongoing atmosphere loss, were confirmed in late 2020.

In 2021, the planetary atmosphere was revealed to be slightly more blue and less absorbing, which may be an indication of planetary weather patterns. By mid-2021, the presence of ions of iron, chromium, vanadium and calcium in the planetary atmosphere was confirmed. In 2022, ionized barium was also detected. By 2022, an absence of titanium in the planetary atmosphere was confirmed and attributed to the nightside condensation of highly refractory titanium dioxide. Observations by HST from 2016 to 2019, published in 2024, confirmed variability in the atmosphere of WASP-121b.

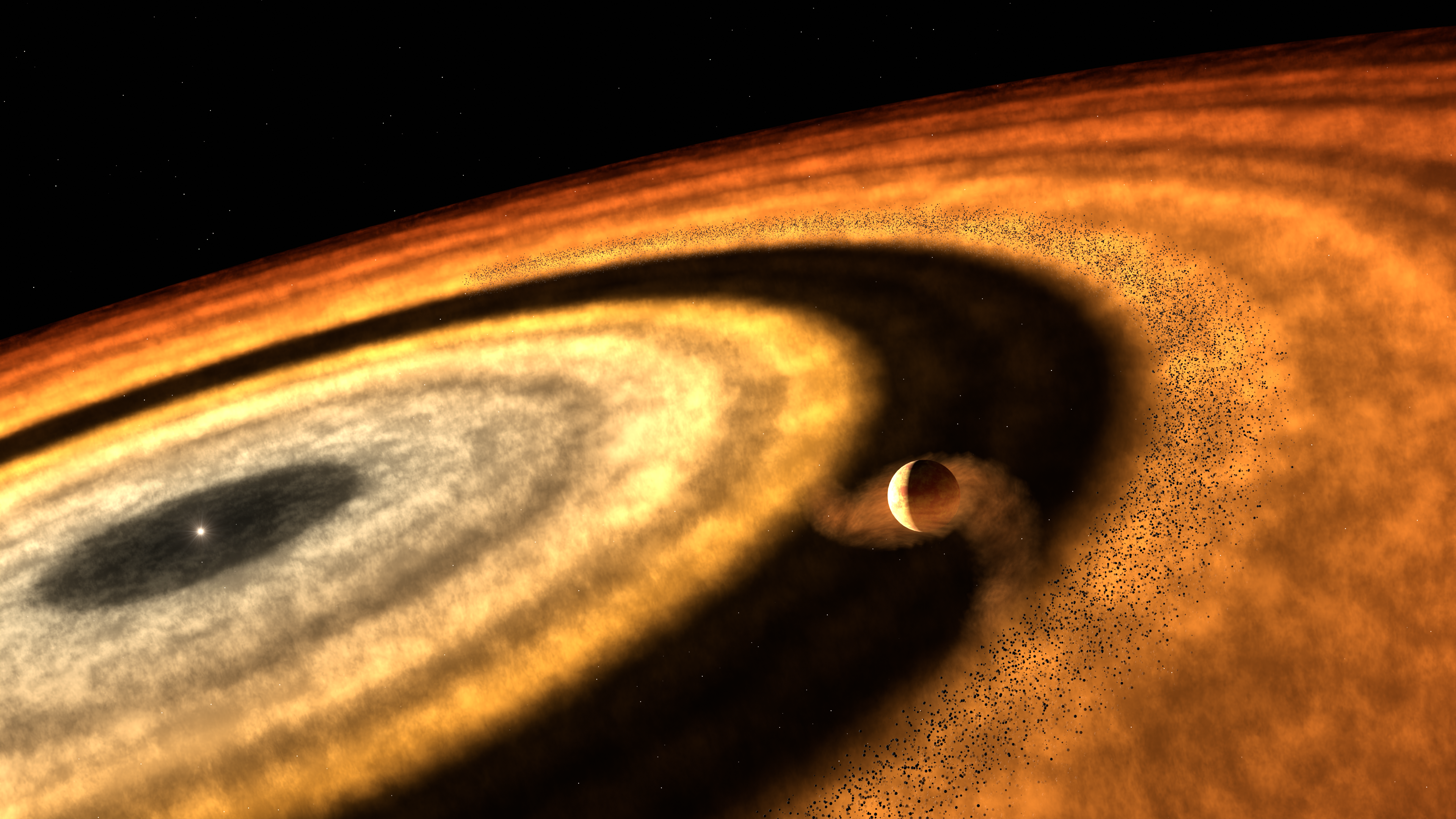
Artist impression of early Tylos/WASP-121b

A 2025 study revealed the first 3D structure of its atmosphere, showing it to be formed of at least three layers. The upper layer consists of hydrogen gas, the middle layer contains sodium and the lower layer iron. A super-rotational sodium-containing jet stream moves material around the equator while the layer below moves the gas from the hot side of the planet to the cooler side. Titanium is detected at a lower latitude below the equatorial jet stream. Another study in 2025 constraining the abundance of volatile elements (carbon and oxygen) and refractory elements (iron and nickel) shows that WASP-121b likely have formed faraway from its host star, in an ice-rich environment, before migrating inward.

== Possible exomoon ==
The sodium detected via absorption spectroscopy around WASP-121b is consistent with an extrasolar gas torus, possibly fueled by an Io-like exomoon.

== See also ==
- List of exoplanet firsts
- List of exoplanets discovered in 2015, including WASP-121b
- List of largest exoplanets
- Wide Angle Search for Planets
- WASP-33b, another ultra-hot Jupiter
- WASP-103b, the first hot Jupiter to have its tidally stretched shape measured
- WASP-12b, another tidally stretched hot Jupiter
- PSR J2322−2650 b, a tidally stretched pulsar planet
