= PSR J1719−1438 b =

Extrasolar pulsar planet

Discovery
- Discovered by: Matthew Bailes et al.
- Discovery site: Melbourne, Australia
- Discovery date: August 25, 2011
- Detection method: Pulsar timing

Orbital characteristics
- Semi-major axis: 0.004 AU (600,000 km)
- Eccentricity: < 0.06
- Orbital period (sidereal): 0.090706293 d 2.176951032 h
- Time of periastron: 2,455,235.51652439
- Star: PSR J1719−1438

Physical characteristics
- Mean radius: ≤0.4 R_{J} ≤4 R_{🜨}
- Mass: ~1.02 M_{J} (~330 M_{🜨})
- Mean density: ≥23 g cm^{−3}

PSR J1719−1438 b is an extrasolar planet that was discovered on August 25, 2011, in orbit around PSR J1719−1438, a millisecond pulsar. The pulsar planet is most likely composed largely of crystalline carbon but with a density far greater than diamond. PSR J1719-1438 b orbits so closely to its host star that its orbit would fit inside the Sun. The existence of such carbon planets had been theoretically postulated.

== Observational history ==
PSR J1719−1438 was first observed in 2009 by a team headed by Matthew Bailes of Swinburne University of Technology in Melbourne, Australia. The orbiting planet was published in the journal Science on August 25, 2011. The planet was confirmed through pulsar timing, in which small modulations detected in the highly regular pulsar signature are measured and extrapolated. Observatories in Britain, Hawaii and Australia were used to confirm these observations.

== Host star ==
PSR J1719−1438 is a pulsar some 4,000 light-years (1,200 parsecs) away from Earth in the Serpens Cauda section of the constellation Serpens, approximately one minute from the border with Ophiuchus. The pulsar completes more than 10,000 rotations a minute. It is approximately 12 miles (19 kilometers) across but with 1.4 solar masses.

== Characteristics ==
PSR J1719−1438 b was, at the time of its August 25, 2011 discovery, the densest planet ever discovered, at nearly 20 times the density of Jupiter (about 23 times the density of water). It is slightly more massive than Jupiter. It is thought to be composed of oxygen and carbon (as opposed to hydrogen and helium, the main components of gas giants like Jupiter and Saturn).

The oxygen is most likely on the surface of the planet, with increasingly higher quantities of carbon deeper inside the planet. The intense pressure acting upon the planet suggests that the carbon is crystallized, much like diamond is.

PSR J1719−1438 b orbits its host star with a period of 2.17 hours and at a distance of 0.89 solar radii (619,173 km or 384,736 mi).

== Formation ==
It is highly unlikely that this planet would have formed before its parent pulsar, as the resulting supernova would destroy any nearby planets. It has been proposed that PSR J1719−1438 b is not a planet but a remnant of a star. Specifically, PSR J1719−1438 b was a yellow dwarf star similar to the Sun in a binary with PSR J1719−1438, a higher-mass star. PSR J1719−1438 swelled up to become a red supergiant, but the yellow dwarf star survived the supernova. Billions of years later, PSR J1719−1438 b became a red giant and then a white dwarf. The gravity from the pulsar stole hydrogen and helium, and the remaining carbon crystallized, forming the diamond planet.

== See also ==
- WASP-12b, a carbon planet
- BPM 37093, a carbon star
- EF Eridani, a star system with a compact star and a degraded substellar-mass former star
- PSR J2322−2650 b, another massive pulsar planet

Preceded by Kepler-10b	Most dense planet 2011–2014	Succeeded by Kepler-131c
