= PSR J2322−2650 =

Millisecond pulsar in the constellation Sculptor

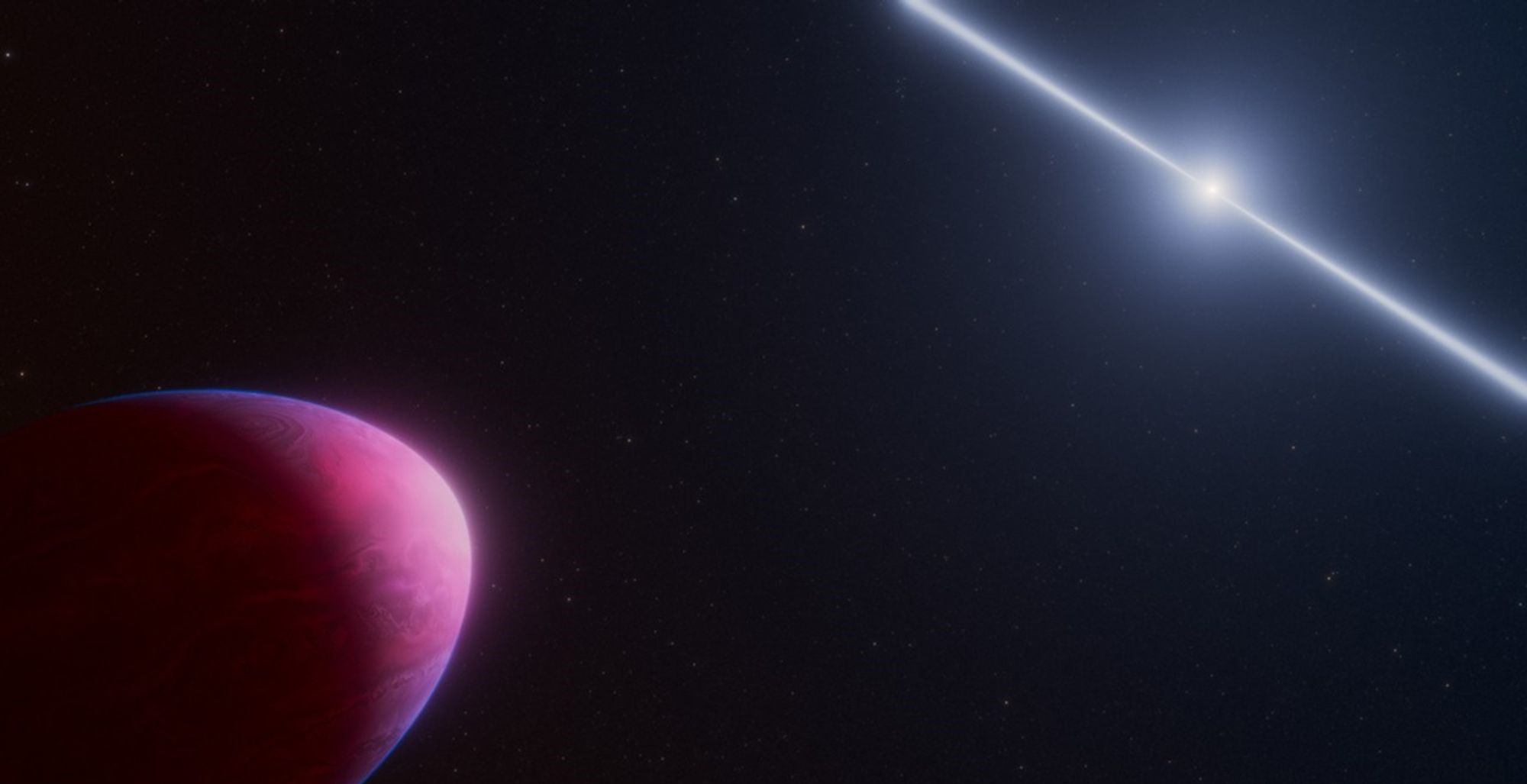
- This artist's concept shows what the exoplanet called PSR J2322-2650b (left) may look like as it orbits a rapidly spinning pulsar star called PSR J2322-2650 (right)

Observation data Epoch J2000 Equinox ICRS
- Constellation: Sculptor
- Right ascension: 23^{h} 22^{m} 34.64^{s}
- Declination: −26° 50′ 58.4″

Characteristics
- Spectral type: Pulsar

Astrometry
Proper motion (μ)	RA: -2.37 mas/yr Dec.: -8.2 mas/yr
Parallax (π)	1.3 mas
Distance	750+294 −163 ly (230+90 −50 pc)

Details
Mass	1.44 M_{☉}
Rotation	3.4630991790879 ms

Database references
SIMBAD	data

PSR J2322−2650 is a millisecond pulsar located approximately 750 light-years (230 parsecs) from Earth in the constellation Sculptor. It is notable for its low luminosity and for hosting a confirmed exoplanet, PSR J2322−2650 b, a Jupiter-mass object discovered through pulsar timing observations in 2017. The system is one of the few known examples of a pulsar with a surviving planetary companion, offering insights into planetary formation and survival in the aftermath of a supernova.

In December 2025, the James Webb Space Telescope (JWST) provided the first detailed infrared observations of the exoplanet, revealing an exotic, carbon and helium dominated atmosphere that challenges conventional models of planetary formation.

== Planetary system ==
The PSR J2322−2650 planetary system
Companion (in order from star)	Mass	Semimajor axis (AU)	Orbital period (days)	Eccentricity	Inclination (°)	Radius
b	~0.7949 M_{J}	0.0102	0.322964	0.0017	—	—

=== PSR J2322−2650 b ===
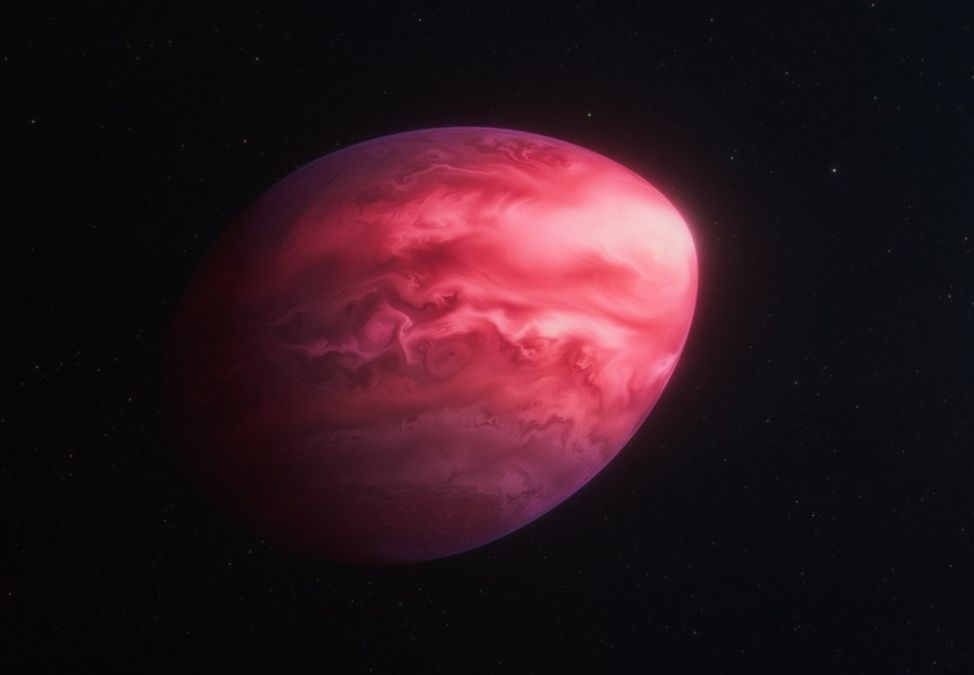
Artist's impression of the pulsar planet PSR J2322-2650b

PSR J2322−2650 b is a tidally locked exoplanet discovered in 2017. In 2025, the James Webb Space Telescope found that the planet's atmosphere is dominated by helium and carbon, likely featuring clouds of carbon soot that condense to create diamonds, but an unexplained absence of nitrogen and oxygen.
