= PSR J1719−1438 =

Millisecond pulsar in the constellation Serpens

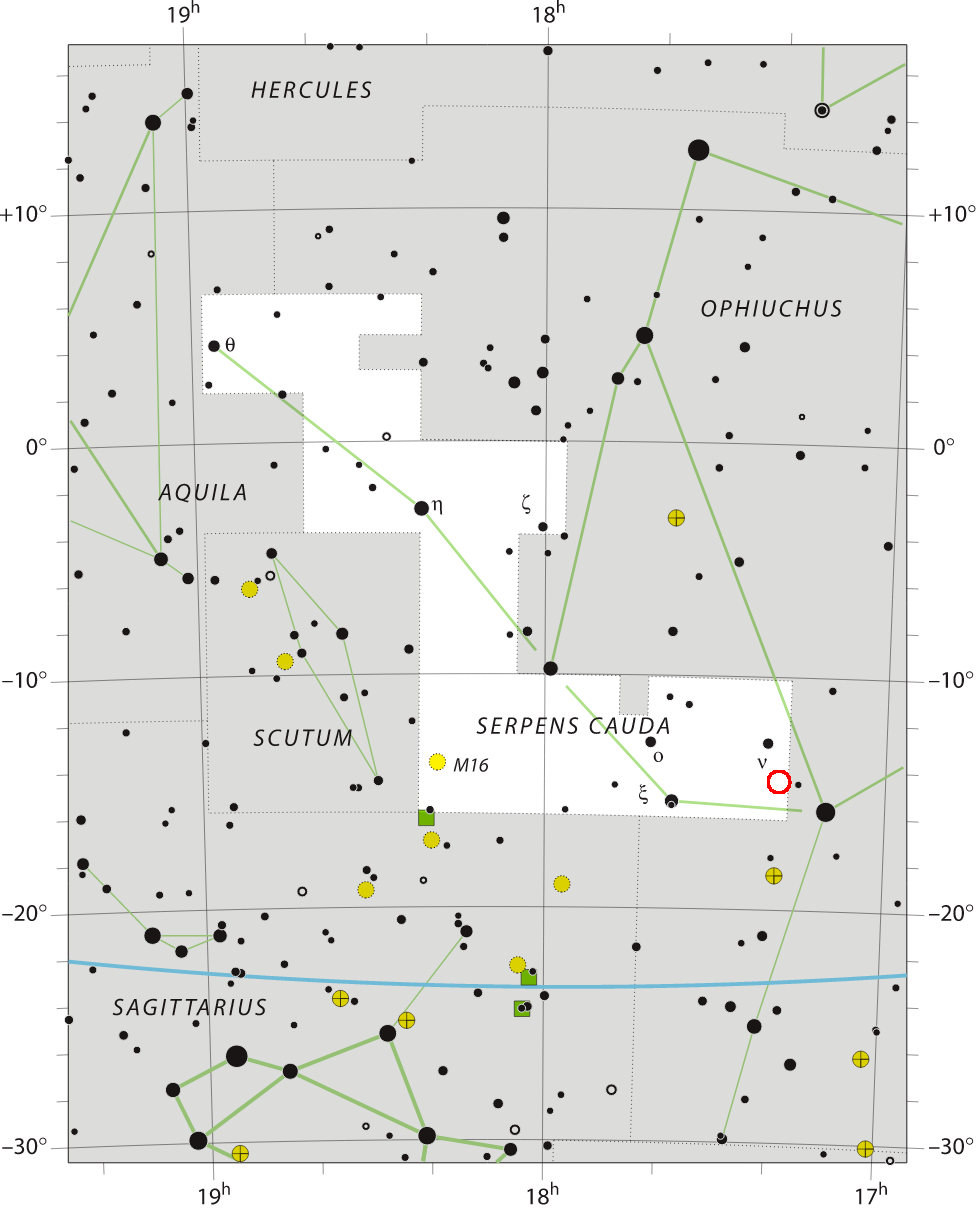
- The location of PSR J1719-1438 (circled in red)

Observation data Epoch MJD 55411.0 Equinox J2000
- Constellation: Serpens
- Right ascension: 17^{h} 19^{m} 10.0730(1)^{s}
- Declination: −14° 38′ 00.96(2)″

Characteristics
- Spectral type: Millisecond pulsar

Astrometry
Distance	~3,900 ly (~1,200 pc)

Orbit
Primary	PSR J1719−1438
Name	PSR J1719−1438 b
Period (P)	2 hours 10 minutes 37.0237 ±0.0002 seconds
Semi-major axis (a)	$a_P\sin i=$0.001819(1) light seconds
Eccentricity (e)	<0.06
Periastron epoch (T)	MJD 55411.0

Details
Mass	1.44 M_{☉}
Radius	19 km
Surface gravity (log g)	13.69 cgs
Rotation	5.7901517700238 ms
Age	11.4 Gyr

Other designations
- PSR J1719−1438

Database references
SIMBAD	data

PSR J1719−1438 is a millisecond pulsar with a spin period of 5.7901 ms and is characteristic age of 11.4 billion years old located about 3,900 light years (1,200 parsecs) from Earth in the direction of Serpens Cauda, one minute from the border with Ophiuchus. Millisecond pulsars are generally thought to begin as normal pulsars and then spin up by accreting matter from a binary companion.

== Diamond planet ==
PSR J1719−1438 was discovered in 2011 by the High Time Resolution Survey, a radio astronomy search for astronomical objects that rapidly vary in radio brightness, such as pulsars. Timing measurements using the Parkes Telescope and Lovell Telescope showed that it has a low-mass companion: PSR J1719−1438 b. The companion has a mass similar to that of Jupiter, but 40% of the diameter. It orbits the pulsar with a period of 2 hours 10 minutes and 37 seconds, at a distance of around 600,000 km (0.89 solar radii). The companion is likely the remnant of a star whose outer layers were siphoned off by the more massive pulsar. Calculations show the companion has a minimum density of 23 grams per cubic centimeter and is probably an ultra-low-mass carbon–oxygen white dwarf.

Because the companion to PSR J1719−1438 is planet-sized, made primarily of carbon (with an unknown amount of oxygen), and very dense, it may be similar to a large diamond. In the science press, the object has been called the "Diamond Planet".

The PSR J1719−1438 planetary system
Companion (in order from star)	Mass	Semimajor axis (AU)	Orbital period (hours)	Eccentricity	Inclination (°)	Radius
b	~1.02 M_{J}	0.004	2.176951032	<0.06	—	≤0.4 R_{J}

=== A lump of QCD matter ===
It has been suggested in 2012 that PSR J1719−1438 b may not be the remnant of a white dwarf, but a lump of quark matter with a size of just 1 kilometer and the mass of Jupiter, that would have been born in the collision and merger of two previous quark stars, part of the ejected matter ending orbiting the merger remnant we see as the pulsar PSR J1719−1438.

== See also ==
- Black widow pulsar – Class of millisecond pulsars
- EF Eridani, a star system with a compact star and a degraded planetary-mass former star
- PSR J1544+4937 – Millisecond pulsar in the constellation Boötes
