= Carbon planet =

Hypothetical type of planet that contains more carbon than oxygen

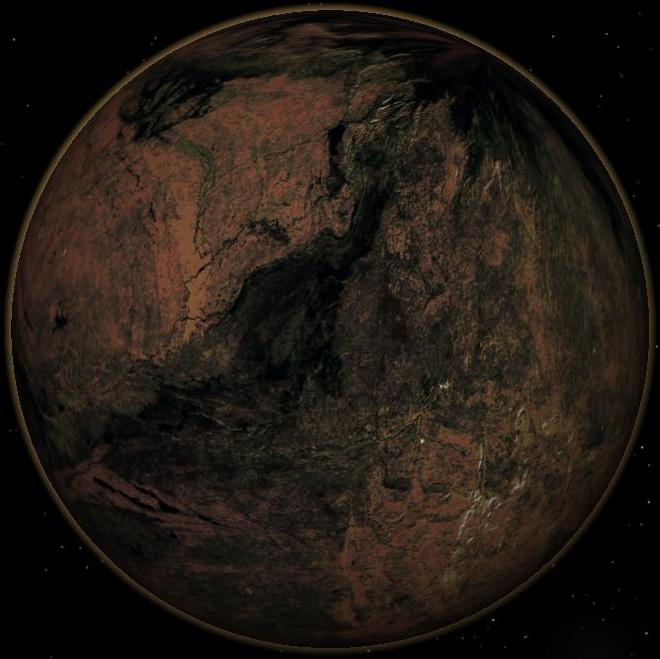
Artist's concept of a carbon planet. The surface is dark and reddish from hydrocarbon deposits.

A carbon planet is a hypothetical type of planet that contains more carbon than oxygen. Carbon is the fourth most abundant element in the universe by mass after hydrogen, helium, and oxygen.

Marc Kuchner and Sara Seager coined the term in 2005 and investigated such planets following the suggestion of Katharina Lodders that Jupiter formed from a carbon-rich core. Prior investigations of planets with high carbon-to-oxygen ratios include Fegley & Cameron 1987. Carbon planets could form if protoplanetary discs are carbon-rich and oxygen-poor. They would develop differently from Earth, Mars, and Venus, which are composed mostly of silicon–oxygen compounds. Different planetary systems have different carbon-to-oxygen ratios, with the Solar System's terrestrial planets closer to being "oxygen planets" with C/O molar ratio of 0.55. In 2020, survey of the 249 nearby solar analog stars found 12% of stars have C/O ratios above 0.65, making them candidates for the carbon-rich planetary systems. The exoplanet 55 Cancri Ae, orbiting a host star with C/O molar ratio of 0.78, is a possible example of a carbon planet.

== Definition ==
A carbon planet would probably have an iron-rich core like the known terrestrial planets. Surrounding that would be molten silicon carbide and titanium carbide. Above that, a layer of carbon in the form of graphite, possibly with a kilometers-thick substratum of diamond if there is sufficient pressure. During volcanic eruptions, it is possible that diamonds from the interior could come up to the surface, resulting in mountains of diamonds and silicon carbides. The surface would contain frozen or liquid hydrocarbons (e.g., tar and methane) and carbon monoxide. A weather cycle is hypothetically possible on carbon planets with an atmosphere, provided that the average surface temperature is below 77 °C.

However, carbon planets would probably be devoid of water, which cannot form because any oxygen delivered by comets or asteroids would react with the carbon on the surface. The atmosphere on a relatively cool carbon planet would consist primarily of carbon dioxide or carbon monoxide with a significant amount of carbon smog.

== Composition ==
Comparison of sizes of planets with different compositions

Carbon planets are predicted to be of similar diameter to silicate and water planets of the same mass, potentially making them difficult to distinguish. The equivalents of geologic features on Earth may also be present but with different compositions. For instance, the rivers might consist of oils. If the temperature is low enough (below 350 K), then gasses may be able to photochemically synthesize into long-chain hydrocarbons, which could rain down onto the surface.

In 2011, NASA cancelled its Terrestrial Planet Finder mission, which was to be an observatory much bigger than the Hubble Space Telescope that would have been able to detect such planets. Theoretically, the spectra of carbon planets would lack water but would show the presence of carbonaceous substances such as carbon monoxide.

== Counter arguments ==
The idea of carbon planets is controversial. Speculation about possible carbon planets must overcome evidence that such formations are unlikely based on measurements and models of the solar system. Rocky solar planetesimals contain 10% of the carbon expected based on the abundance of carbon in the universe. This suggests that rather than simply reflecting elemental abundance, carbon grains are actively decomposed during planetesimal formation.

== Possible candidates ==
The pulsar planets Draugr, Poltergeist and Phobetor may be carbon planets that formed from the disruption of a carbon-producing star. Carbon planets might also be located near the Galactic Center or globular clusters orbiting the Milky Way, where stars have a higher carbon-to-oxygen ratio than the Sun. When old stars die, they spew out large quantities of carbon. As time passes and more generations of stars end, the concentration of carbon and carbon planets will increase.

In 2012, it was announced that Janssen showed evidence for being a carbon planet. It has eight times the mass of Earth and twice the radius. Research indicates that the 2,150 °C (3,900 °F) planet is covered in graphite and diamond rather than water and granite. It orbits the star Copernicus once every 18 hours.

== Other carbon-rich objects ==
In 2011, astrophysicist Matthew Bailes and colleagues from Swinburne University of Technology in Australia reported that the millisecond pulsar PSR J1719-1438 may have a binary companion star, PSR J1719−1438 b, that has been crushed into a much smaller planet made largely of solid diamond. They deduced that a small companion planet must be orbiting the pulsar and causing a detectable gravitational pull. Further examination revealed that although the planet is relatively small (60,000 km in diameter, or five times larger than Earth) its mass is slightly more than that of Jupiter. The high density of PSR J1719−1438 b gave the team a clue to its likely makeup of carbon and oxygen—and suggested the crystalline form of the elements. However, this "planet" is hypothesized to be the remains of an evaporated white dwarf companion, being only the remnant inner core. According to some definitions of planet, this would not qualify because it formed as a star.

At a distance of 267+1.2
−0.9 pc (approximately 870 light-years), PSR J2222−0137 is a nearby intermediate-mass binary pulsar whose low-mass neutron star companion is a white dwarf (PSR J2222−0137 b). The white dwarf has a relatively large mass of 1.319 ± 0.004 M_{☉} and a temperature less than 3,000 K, meaning it is likely crystallized, leading to this Earth-sized white dwarf being described as a "diamond-star".

== See also ==
- Extraterrestrial diamonds
- Helium planet, another form of mass-lost white dwarf becoming a planet
- Iron planet
- Ocean planet
- WASP-12b
- WASP-103b
