= WASP-103 =

Star in the constellation Hercules

Observation data Epoch J2000 Equinox ICRS
- Constellation: Hercules
- Right ascension: 16^{h} 37^{m} 15.5766^{s}
- Declination: +07° 11′ 00.110″
- Apparent magnitude (V): 12.1

Characteristics
- Evolutionary stage: main-sequence star
- Spectral type: F8V

Astrometry
Radial velocity (R_{v})	−40.69±1.00 km/s
Proper motion (μ)	RA: −9.756 mas/yr Dec.: 2.779 mas/yr
Parallax (π)	1.8332±0.1073 mas
Distance	1,800 ± 100 ly (550 ± 30 pc)

Details
Mass	1.220^{+0.039}_{−0.036} M_{☉}
Radius	1.436^{+0.052}_{−0.031} R_{☉}
Luminosity	3.3 L_{☉}
Surface gravity (log g)	4.35±0.02 cgs
Temperature	6110±160 K
Metallicity [Fe/H]	0.06±0.13 dex
Rotational velocity (v sin i)	10.60±0.90 km/s
Age	4±1 Gyr

Other designations
- 2MASS J16371556+0711000, Gaia DR2 4439085988769170432

Database references
SIMBAD	data

WASP-103 is an F-type main-sequence star located 1,800 ± 100 light-years (550 ± 30 parsecs) away in the constellation Hercules. Its surface temperature is 6,110±160 kelvins (K). The star's concentration of heavy elements is similar to that of the Sun. WASP-103 is slightly younger than the Sun at 4±1 billion years. The chromospheric activity of the star is elevated due to interaction with the giant planet on a close-in orbit.

A multiplicity survey in 2015 found a suspected stellar companion to WASP-103, at a projected separation of 0.242″±0.016″.

== Planetary system ==
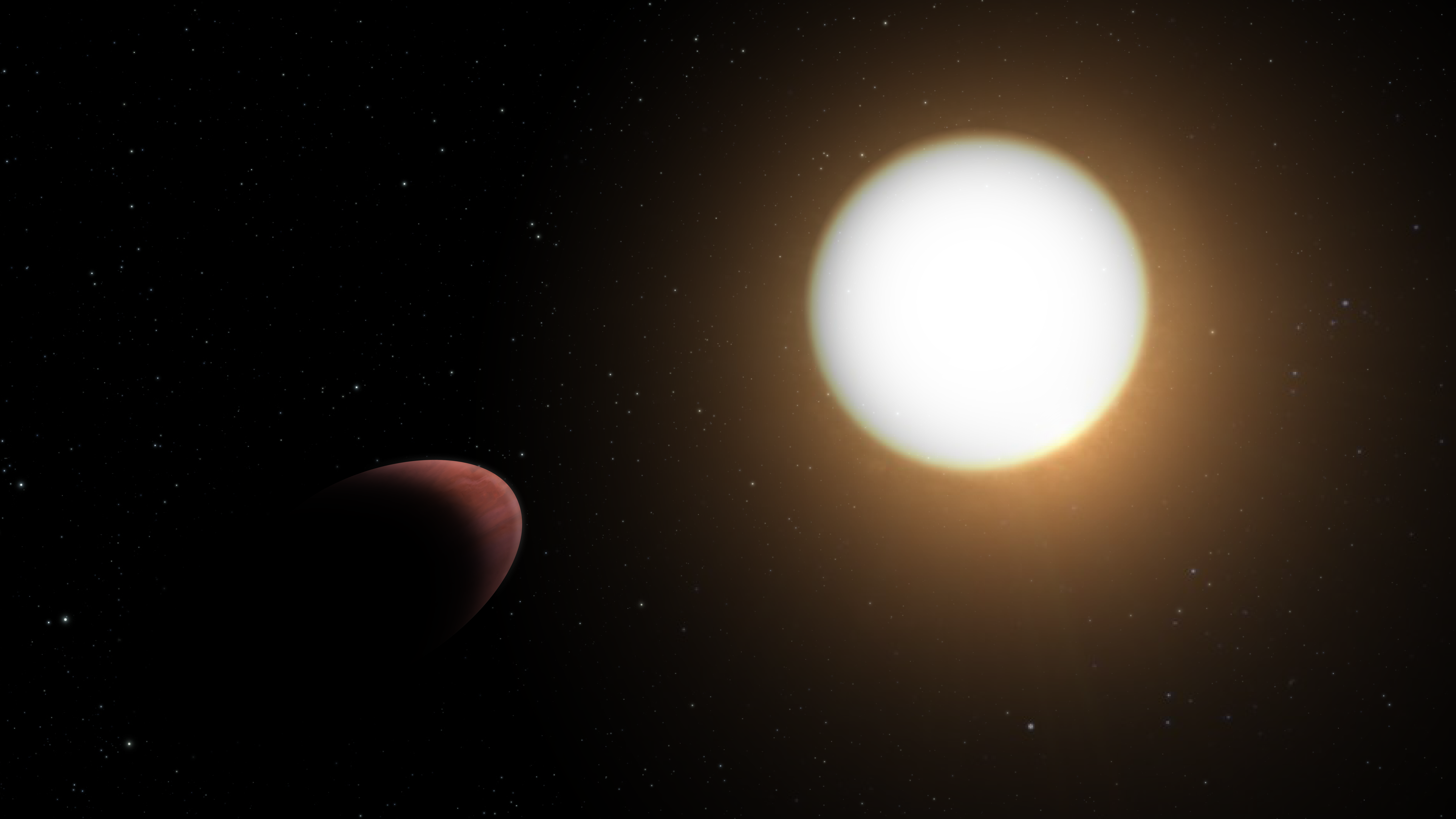
Artist's impression of WASP-103b and its host star

In 2014 one super-Jupiter planet, named WASP-103b, was discovered by the transit method. The planet is orbiting its host star in 22 hours and may be close to the limit of tidal disruption. Orbital decay was not detected by 2020. In early 2022, the planet was popularized because of its shape similar to a potato.

The planetary atmosphere contains water, and possibly hydrogen cyanide, titanium(II) oxide, or sodium. The planet has an elevated carbon to oxygen molar fraction of 0.9 or 1.35^{+0.14}_{−0.17}, therefore it is nearly certain to be a carbon planet.

Though the planetary equilibrium temperature is 2,484±67 K, the planet is tidally locked to WASP-103 and has one side in permanent day and the other side in permanent night. A significant temperature difference exists between the night side and day side; the dayside temperature is 2,930±40 K, while the night side temperature is 1,880±40 K.

The WASP-103 planetary system
Companion (in order from star)	Mass	Semimajor axis (AU)	Orbital period (days)	Eccentricity	Inclination (°)	Radius
b	1.455^{+0.090}_{−0.091} M_{J}	0.01987^{+0.00020}_{−0.00021}	0.9255456±0.0000013	<0.15	87.3±1.2	1.528^{+0.073}_{−0.047} R_{J}
