= WASP-121 =

Star in the constellation Puppis

WASP-121 / Dilmun
Observation data Epoch J2000.0 Equinox ICRS
- Constellation: Puppis
- Right ascension: 07^{h} 10^{m} 24.06046^{s}
- Declination: −39° 05′ 50.5712″
- Apparent magnitude (V): 10.4

Characteristics
- Evolutionary stage: main sequence
- Spectral type: F6V
- Apparent magnitude (B): 11.00
- Apparent magnitude (V): 10.51
- Apparent magnitude (J): 9.625
- Apparent magnitude (H): 9.439
- Apparent magnitude (K): 9.374

Astrometry
Radial velocity (R_{v})	38.25±0.22 km/s
Proper motion (μ)	RA: −3.735 mas/yr Dec.: +25.663 mas/yr
Parallax (π)	3.7996±0.0104 mas
Distance	858 ± 2 ly (263.2 ± 0.7 pc)

Details
Mass	1.330±0.019 M_{☉}
Radius	1.461±0.015 R_{☉}
Surface gravity (log g)	4.251±0.003 cgs
Temperature	6,628±66 K
Metallicity [Fe/H]	+0.17±0.05 dex
Rotational velocity (v sin i)	11.90±0.31 km/s
Age	1.11±0.14 Gyr

Other designations
- Dilmun, CD−38 3220, TOI-495, WASP-121, TYC 7630-352-1, 2MASS J07102406-3905506

Database references
SIMBAD	data

WASP-121, also known as CD−38 3220 and formally named Dilmun, is a magnitude 10.4 star located approximately 858 light-years (263 parsecs) away in the constellation Puppis. WASP-121 has a mass and radius similar to the Sun's. It hosts one known exoplanet. Due to the star's strongly titled rotational axis with a stellar inclination angle of 8.1°, the planet's orbit is almost polar.

The star, although metal-rich in terms of overall contents of heavy elements, is depleted of carbon. The carbon to oxygen molar ratio of 0.23±0.05 for WASP-121 is well below the solar ratio of 0.55.

== Nomenclature ==
The designation WASP-121 indicates that this was the 121st star found to have a planet by the Wide Angle Search for Planets.

In August 2022, this planetary system was included among 20 systems to be named by the third NameExoWorlds project. The approved names, proposed by a team from Bahrain, were announced in June 2023. WASP-121 is named Dilmun after the ancient civilization, and its planet is named Tylos after the ancient Greek name for Bahrain.

== Planetary system ==
In 2015, the exoplanet WASP-121b was discovered orbiting WASP-121 by the transit method. WASP-121b is a hot Jupiter with a mass about 1.18 times that of Jupiter and a radius about 1.81 times that of Jupiter. The exoplanet orbits WASP-121, its host star, every 1.27 days. Hot water molecules have been found in the stratosphere of WASP-121b (i.e., the atmospheric layer in which temperatures increase as the altitude increases).

The WASP-121 planetary system
Companion (in order from star)	Mass	Semimajor axis (AU)	Orbital period (days)	Eccentricity	Inclination (°)	Radius
b / Tylos	1.170±0.043 M_{J}	0.02571±0.00010	1.275	0.0	87.6	1.742±0.006 R_{J}

== Gallery ==
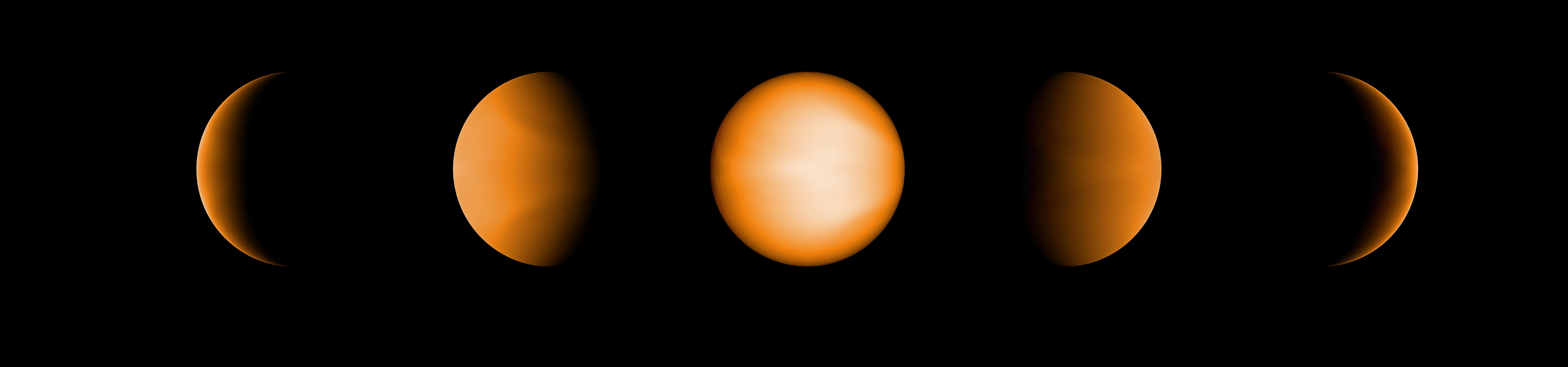
WASP-121b – computer-simulated views (August 2018)

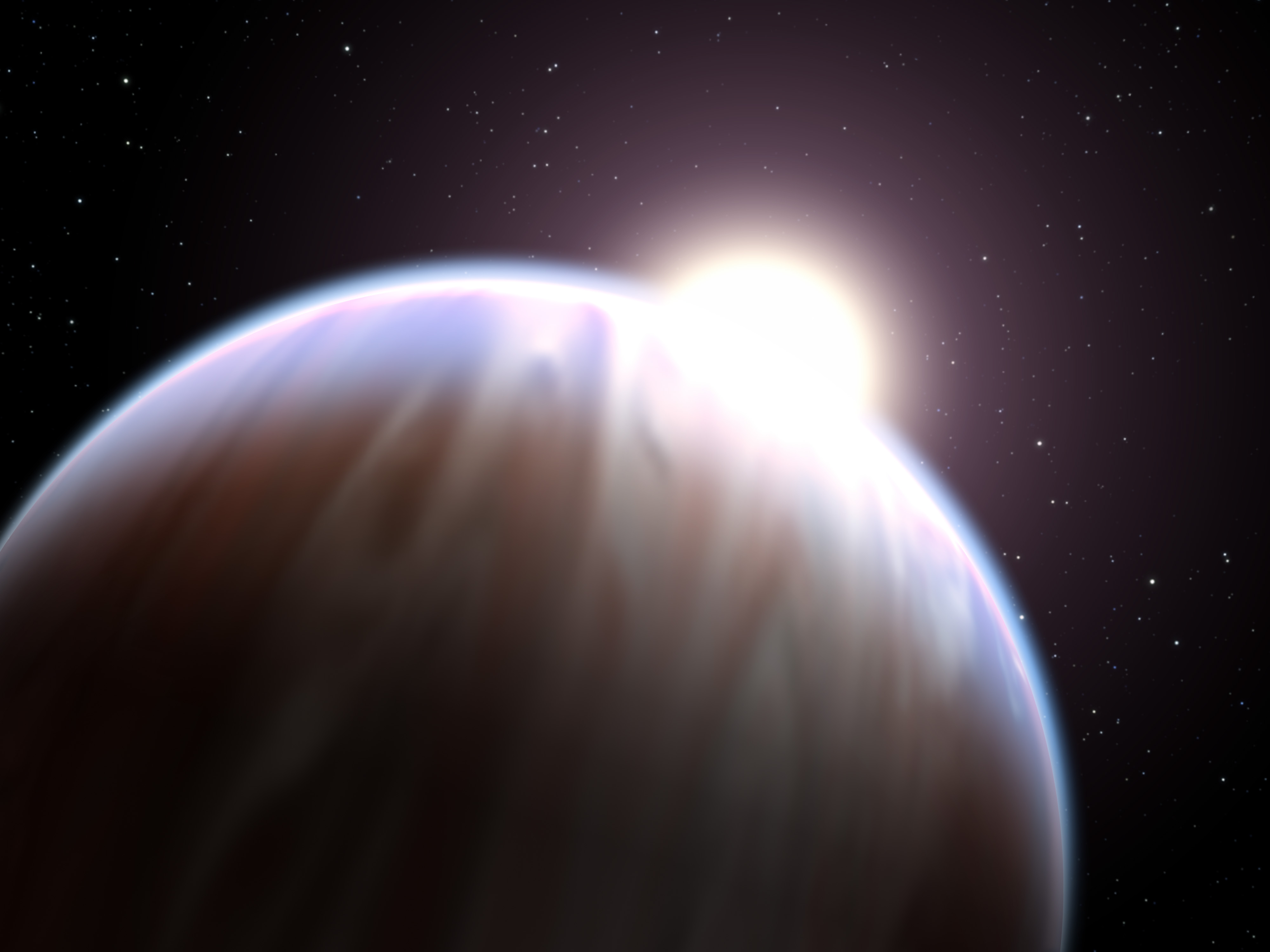
An artist's impression of a hot Jupiter planet

== See also ==
- List of exoplanet firsts
- List of exoplanets discovered in 2015
- SuperWASP
- WASP-33b
