= PSR J2322−2650 b =

Extrasolar pulsar planet

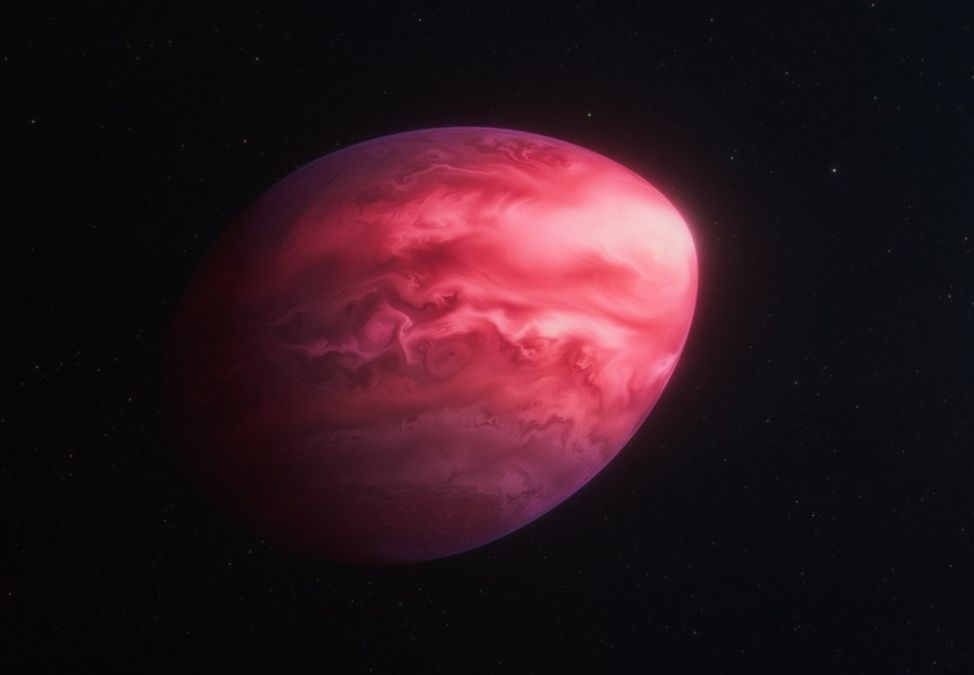
- Artist's impression of the pulsar planet PSR J2322-2650b

Discovery
- Discovered by: Spiewak et al.
- Discovery site: Cheshire, England
- Discovery date: 2017
- Detection method: Pulsar timing

Orbital characteristics
- Semi-major axis: 0.0102 AU (1.53 million km)
- Eccentricity: < 0.0017
- Orbital period (sidereal): 0.322964 d 7.7511 h
- Star: PSR J2322−2650

Physical characteristics
- Mass: ~0.7949 M_{J} (~252.64 M_{🜨})
- Mean density: >1.84 g cm^{3}
- Temperature: 1,200 °F (649 °C) (nightside); 3,700 °F (2,040 °C) (dayside)

PSR J2322−2650 b is a tidally locked exoplanet discovered in 2017, orbiting the millisecond pulsar PSR J2322−2650. In 2025, the James Webb Space Telescope found that the planet's atmosphere is dominated by helium and carbon, likely featuring clouds of carbon soot that condense to create diamonds, but an unexplained absence of nitrogen and oxygen. PSR J2322−2650 b orbits approximately 1 million miles from its host star—a distance equivalent to less than 1% of Earth's orbit. The tidal effects (differences in gravity from the front of the planet to the back) from the host star are so intense, because of the small orbital distance, that the planet has been stretched into the shape of a lemon.

== Host star ==
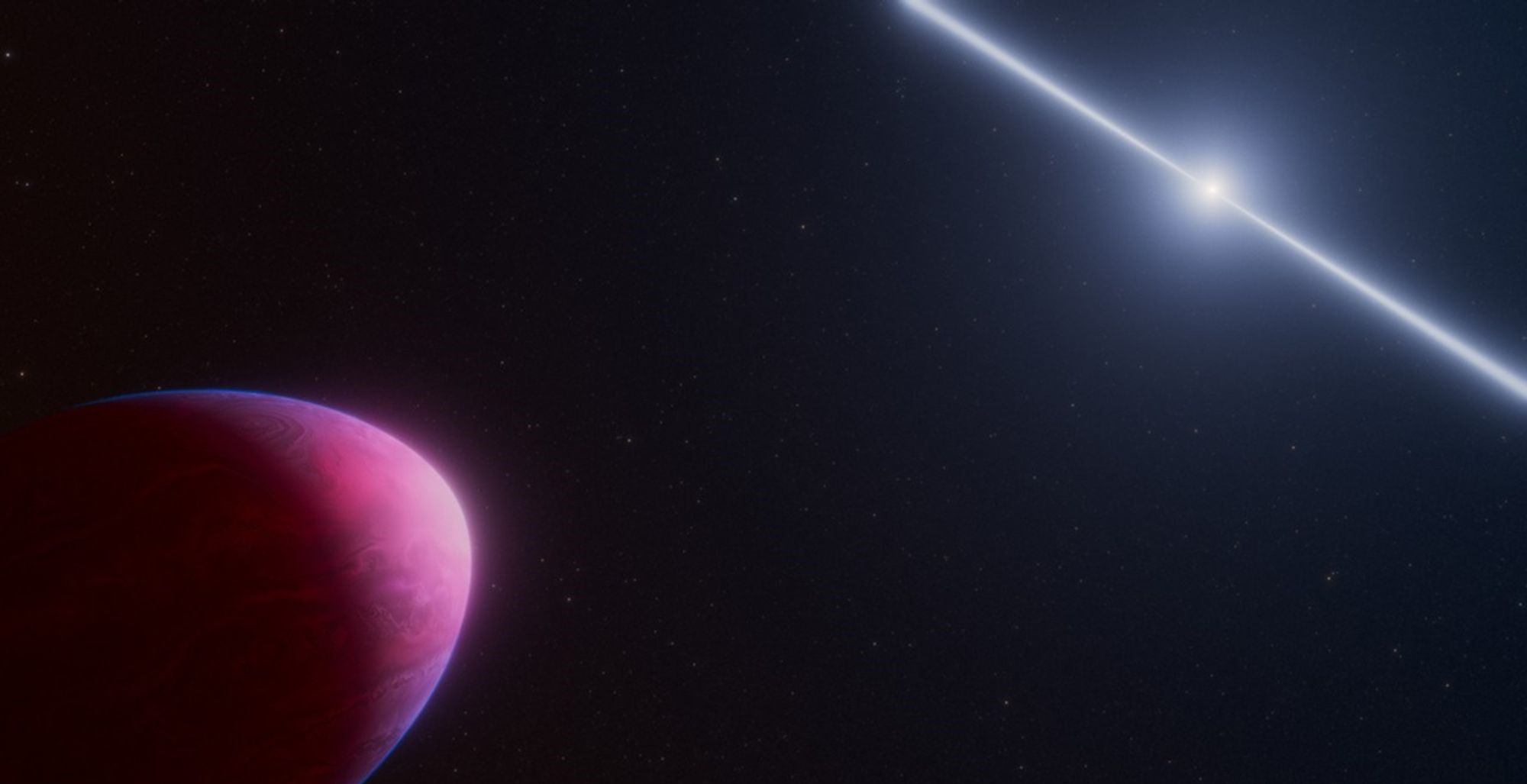
This artist's concept shows what PSR J2322-2650b (left) may look like as it orbits PSR J2322-2650 (right).

PSR J2322−2650 is a pulsar some 750 light-years (230 parsecs) away from Earth in the constellation Sculptor. The pulsar completes around 300 rotations a second, equivalent to 18,000 rotations a minute. While the mass and size of PSR J2322−2650 is not directly measured with high precision, the mass is likely to be around 1.4 solar masses with a diameter of between 10 and 20 kilometers.

== Characteristics ==
The temperatures on the tidally locked PSR J2322−2650 b range from about 1,200 °F (649 °C) on the side that perpetually faces away from its host star to about 3,700 °F (2,040 °C) on the hotter side that perpetually faces the host star. Due to the immense heat, the planet's appearance glows red. Because of the strong gravitational pull from its host pulsar star, the planet's equatorial diameter has been stretched to about 38 percent wider than its polar diameter, giving it a shape similar to a lemon.

The planet's atmosphere is dominated by helium and also carbon, more specifically, diatomic carbon (C_{2}) and tricarbon (C_{3}), with an almost complete absence of detectable oxygen and nitrogen as both C_{2} and C_{3} only remain detectable as if oxygen and nitrogen are almost entirely absent. In addition, the planet does not exhibit large amounts or is potentially absent of water vapor, methane, or carbon dioxide, unlike most other exoplanets studied. Deep within the planet's atmosphere, under immense pressure, carbon might be compressed into diamonds, resulting in an atmosphere that rains diamonds.

== See also ==
- PSR J1719−1438 b
