= PSR J1544+4937 =

Millisecond pulsar in the constellation Boötes

Observation data Epoch J2000 Equinox ICRS
- Constellation: Boötes
- Right ascension: 15^{h} 44^{m} 04.166^{s}
- Declination: +49° 37′ 57.45″

Characteristics
- Spectral type: Pulsar

Details
Rotation	2.15928839042476 ms
Age	12.2 Gyr

Other designations
- 3FGL J1544.0+4938

Database references
SIMBAD	data

PSR J1544+4937 is a pulsar and gamma-ray source. It is a millisecond pulsar with a very short rotation period of 2.1592 milliseconds and is characteristic age of 12.2 billion years old. Additionally, it has a planet or brown dwarf known as PSR J1544+4937 b.

The PSR J1544+4937 planetary system
Companion (in order from star)	Mass	Semimajor axis (AU)	Orbital period (days)	Eccentricity	Inclination (°)	Radius
b	18 M_{J}	0.00537	0.1207729895±0.0000000001	—	—	—

== See also ==
- Black Widow pulsar
