= WASP-12 =

Star in the constellation Auriga

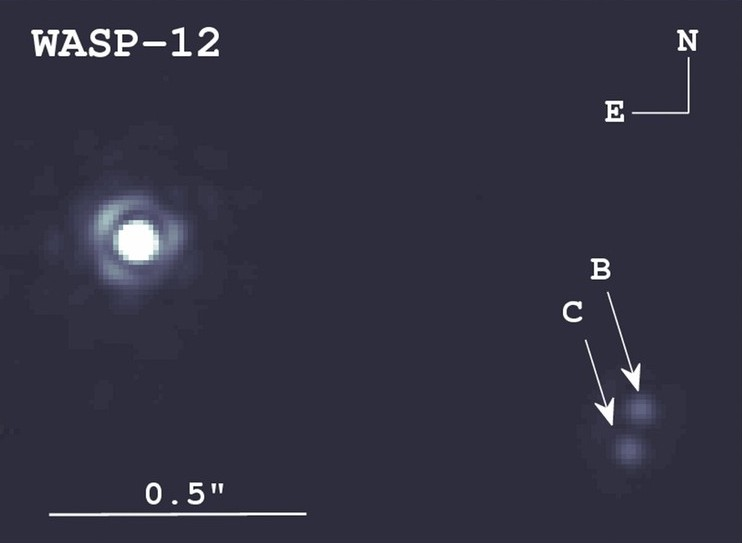
- Keck Observatory image of WASP-12A (left) with WASP-12B and C (right, indicated)

Observation data Epoch J2000.0 Equinox ICRS
- Constellation: Auriga
- Right ascension: 06^{h} 30^{m} 32.7966^{s}
- Declination: +29° 40′ 20.264″
- Apparent magnitude (V): 11.560±0.068

Characteristics
- Spectral type: G0V + M3V + M3V
- Apparent magnitude (B): 12.138±0.019
- Apparent magnitude (R): ~11.6
- Apparent magnitude (J): 10.477±0.021
- Apparent magnitude (H): 10.228±0.022
- Apparent magnitude (K): 10.188±0.020

Astrometry
Radial velocity (R_{v})	20.62±1.44 km/s
Proper motion (μ)	RA: −1.519(19) mas/yr Dec.: −6.761(15) mas/yr
Parallax (π)	2.4213±0.0166 mas
Distance	1,347 ± 9 ly (413 ± 3 pc)

Orbit
Primary	WASP-12 A
Name	WASP-12 BC
Period (P)	393.9 days
Semi-major axis (a)	21±3 AU

Details

A
Mass	1.325+0.026 −0.018 M_{☉}
Radius	1.690+0.019 −0.018 R_{☉}
Luminosity	4.05+0.54 −0.53 L_{☉}
Surface gravity (log g)	4.11±0.11 cgs
Temperature	6265±50 K
Metallicity [Fe/H]	+0.12±0.07 dex
Rotational velocity (v sin i)	<1.9 km/s
Age	3.05±0.32 Gyr

Details

B
Mass	0.38±0.05 M_{☉}

C
Mass	0.37±0.05 M_{☉}

Other designations
- TOI-1725, TIC 86396382, TYC 1891-1178-1, 2MASS J06303279+2940202, UCAC2 42216354

Database references
SIMBAD	A
- BC
Exoplanet Archive	data

WASP-12 is a magnitude 11 yellow dwarf star located approximately 1347 light-years away in the constellation Auriga. WASP-12 has a mass and radius similar to the Sun and is known for being orbited by a planet that is extremely hot and has a retrograde orbit around WASP-12. WASP-12 forms a triple star system with two red dwarf companions. Both of them have spectral types of M3V and are only 38% and 37% as massive as the Sun, respectively.

== Planetary system ==
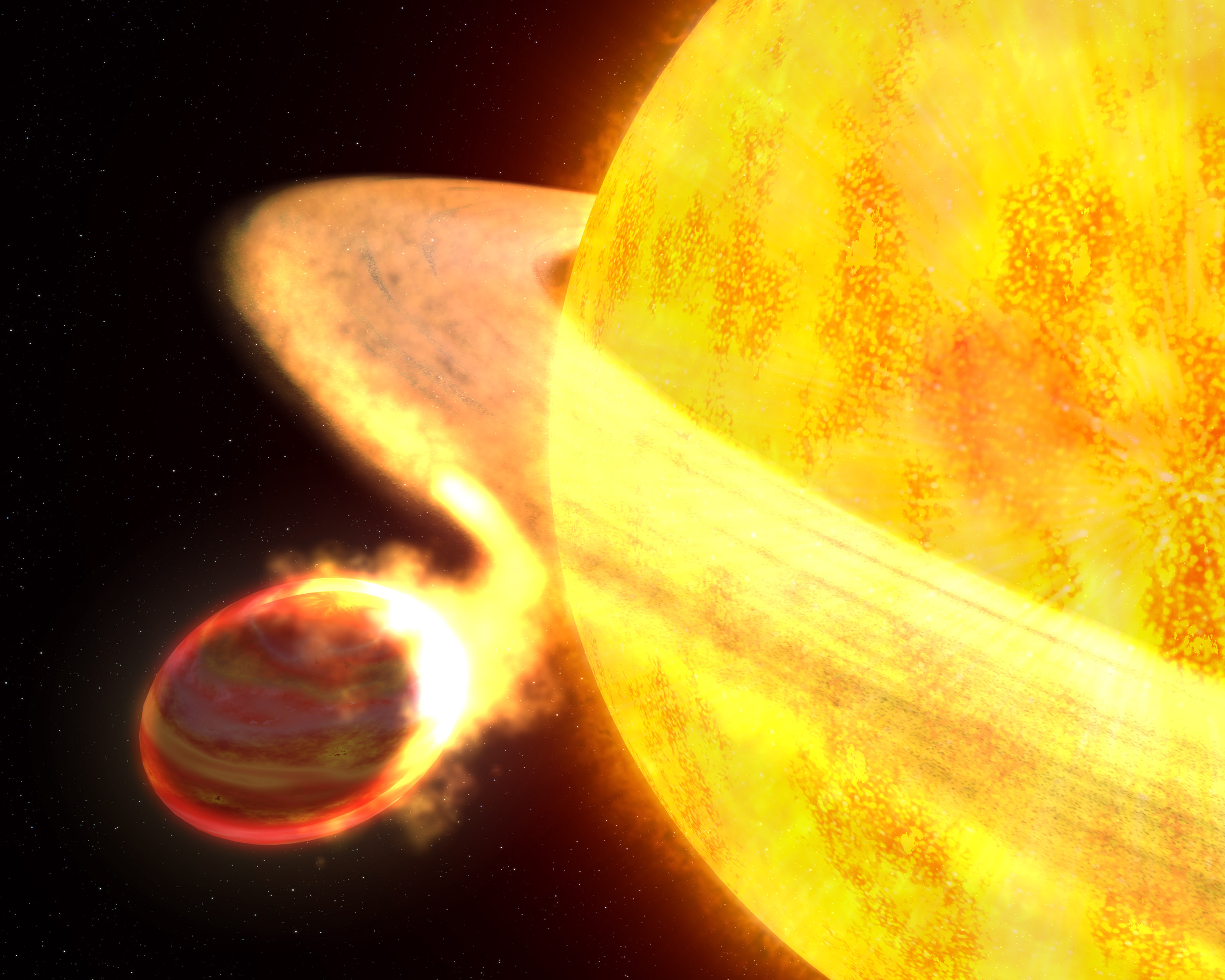
Artist's conception of WASP-12 & WASP-12b

In 2008, the exoplanet WASP-12b was discovered orbiting WASP-12 by SuperWASP, using the transit method. It is a hot Jupiter completing an orbit around its star in just one day. Its high carbon-to-oxygen ratio indicates that rocky planets might have formed in the star system, and it may be a carbon planet. It is subject to intensive photo-evaporation, and may be completely destroyed within one billion years from now.

In 2015, no indications of additional planets were found in the WASP-12 system.

The WASP-12 planetary system
Companion (in order from star)	Mass	Semimajor axis (AU)	Orbital period (days)	Eccentricity	Inclination (°)	Radius
b	1.465±0.079 M_{J}	0.0232±0.00064	1.09142030(14)	<0.02	83.52±0.03	1.937±0.056 R_{J}
