= WASP-19 =

Star in the constellation Vela

WASP-19 / Wattle
Observation data Epoch J2000.0 Equinox ICRS
- Constellation: Vela
- Right ascension: 09^{h} 53^{m} 40.07656^{s}
- Declination: −45° 39′ 33.0572″
- Apparent magnitude (V): 12.312 ± 0.017

Characteristics
- Evolutionary stage: main sequence
- Spectral type: G8V
- Apparent magnitude (B): 13.05
- Apparent magnitude (R): 12.12
- Apparent magnitude (I): 11.35
- Apparent magnitude (J): 10.911 ± 0.026
- Apparent magnitude (H): 10.602 ± 0.022
- Apparent magnitude (K): 10.481 ± 0.023
- B−V color index: 1.3
- V−R color index: 0.1
- R−I color index: 0.82
- Variable type: planetary transit

Astrometry
Radial velocity (R_{v})	21.41±0.95 km/s
Proper motion (μ)	RA: −35.457 mas/yr Dec.: 17.378 mas/yr
Parallax (π)	3.7516±0.0090 mas
Distance	869 ± 2 ly (266.6 ± 0.6 pc)
Absolute magnitude (M_{V})	5.3

Details
Mass	0.965+0.091 −0.095 M_{☉}
Radius	1.006+0.031 −0.034 R_{☉}
Luminosity	0.905+0.071 −0.069 L_{☉}
Surface gravity (log g)	4.417+0.020 −0.021 cgs
Temperature	5616+66 −65 K
Metallicity [Fe/H]	0.04+0.25 −0.30 dex
Rotation	11.76±0.09 d
Rotational velocity (v sin i)	4.0 ± 1.0 km/s
Age	6.4+4.1 −3.5 Gyr

Other designations
- Wattle, TOI-655, TIC 35516889, WASP-19, GSC 08181-01711, 2MASS J09534008-4539330, USNO-B1.0 0443-00193111

Database references
SIMBAD	data
Exoplanet Archive	data

WASP-19, formally named Wattle, is a magnitude 12.3 star about 869 light-years (266 parsecs) away, located in the constellation Vela of the Southern Hemisphere. This star has been found to host a transiting hot Jupiter-type planet in a tight orbit.

WASP-19 is older than the Sun, has a fraction of heavy elements above the solar abundance, and is rotating rapidly, being spun up by the tides raised by the giant planet on a close orbit.

== Nomenclature ==
The designation WASP-19 indicates that this was the 19th star found to have a planet by the Wide Angle Search for Planets.

In August 2022, this planetary system was included among 20 systems to be named by the third NameExoWorlds project. The approved names were proposed by a team from Brandon Park Primary School in Wheelers Hill (Melbourne, Australia), led by scientist Lance C. Kelly and teacher David Maierhofer and announced in June 2023. WASP-19 is named "Wattle" and its planet is named "Banksia", after the plant genera Wattle (specifically the golden wattle Acacia pycnantha) and Banksia (specifically the scarlet banksia Banksia coccinea) respectively.

== Planetary system ==
In December 2009, the SuperWASP project announced that a hot Jupiter type exoplanet, WASP-19b, was orbiting very close to this star and with the shortest orbital period of any transiting exoplanet known at the time.

The WASP-19 planetary system
Companion (in order from star)	Mass	Semimajor axis (AU)	Orbital period (days)	Eccentricity	Inclination (°)	Radius
b / Banksia	1.154+0.078 −0.080 M_{J}	0.01652+0.00050 −0.00056	0.78883852(82)	0.0126+0.014 −0.0089	79.08+0.34 −0.37	1.415+0.044 −0.048 R_{J}
