= WASP-39 =

G-type star in the constellation Virgo

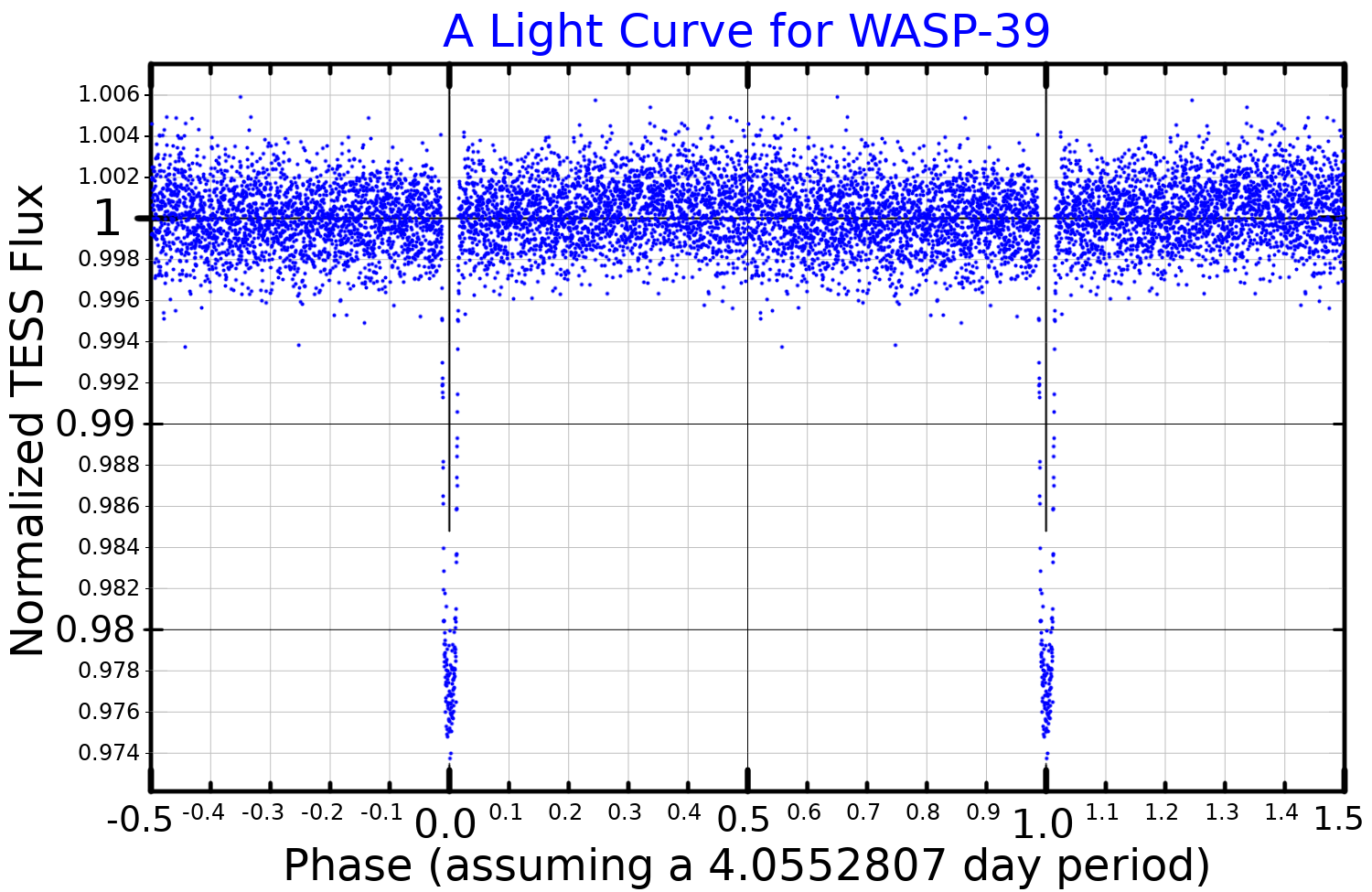
- A light curve for WASP-39, plotted from TESS data

Observation data Epoch J2000 Equinox ICRS
- Constellation: Virgo
- Right ascension: 14^{h} 29^{m} 18.41517^{s}
- Declination: −03° 26′ 40.2045″
- Apparent magnitude (V): 12.11

Characteristics
- Evolutionary stage: main sequence
- Spectral type: G8
- Variable type: planetary transit

Astrometry
Radial velocity (R_{v})	−58.51±0.83 km/s
Proper motion (μ)	RA: -19.041 mas/yr Dec.: +0.437 mas/yr
Parallax (π)	4.6435±0.0144 mas
Distance	702 ± 2 ly (215.4 ± 0.7 pc)

Details
Mass	0.93±0.03 M_{☉}
Radius	0.895±0.023 R_{☉}
Luminosity	0.63 L_{☉}
Surface gravity (log g)	4.4±0.2 cgs
Temperature	5,400±150 K
Metallicity [Fe/H]	−0.12±0.10 dex
Rotational velocity (v sin i)	1.4±0.6 km/s
Age	9+3 −4 Gyr

Other designations
- Malmok, V732 Vir, TOI-5675, TIC 181949561, WASP-39, 2MASS J14291840-0326403

Database references
SIMBAD	data
Exoplanet Archive	data

WASP-39, also named Malmok, is a G-type main-sequence star about 702 light-years (215 parsecs) away in the constellation Virgo. With an apparent magnitude of 12.1, it is much too faint to be visible to the naked eye. The star is slightly smaller and cooler than the Sun. It hosts one known exoplanet, WASP-39b.

== Nomenclature ==
The designation WASP-39 comes from the Wide Angle Search for Planets. Since the planet transits the star, the star is classified as a planetary transit variable and has received the variable star designation V732 Virginis.

This was one of the systems selected to be named in the 2019 NameExoWorlds campaign during the 100th anniversary of the IAU, which assigned each country a star and planet to be named. This system was assigned to Aruba. The approved names were Malmok for the star and Bocaprins for the planet, named after Malmok and Boca Prins, both beaches in Aruba.

== Planetary system ==
The planet WASP-39b, later named Bocaprins, is a low-density hot Jupiter, about the mass of Saturn but larger, discovered in 2011 by the Wide Angle Search for Planets using the transit method. Its orbit is aligned with the star's equator. It has been a target for observation by the Hubble Space Telescope and James Webb Space Telescope, which have identified water vapor, carbon dioxide and sulfur dioxide in its atmosphere.

There is evidence of a possible circumstellar disk around WASP-39, farther than 2 AU from the star.

The WASP-39 planetary system
Companion (in order from star)	Mass	Semimajor axis (AU)	Orbital period (days)	Eccentricity	Inclination (°)	Radius
b / Bocaprins	0.275+0.042 −0.043 M_{J}	0.04859+0.00051 −0.00053	4.05529470(97)	<0.048	87.83+0.25 −0.22	1.27±0.04 R_{J}
