= WASP-12b =

Hot Jupiter exoplanet in the constellation Auriga

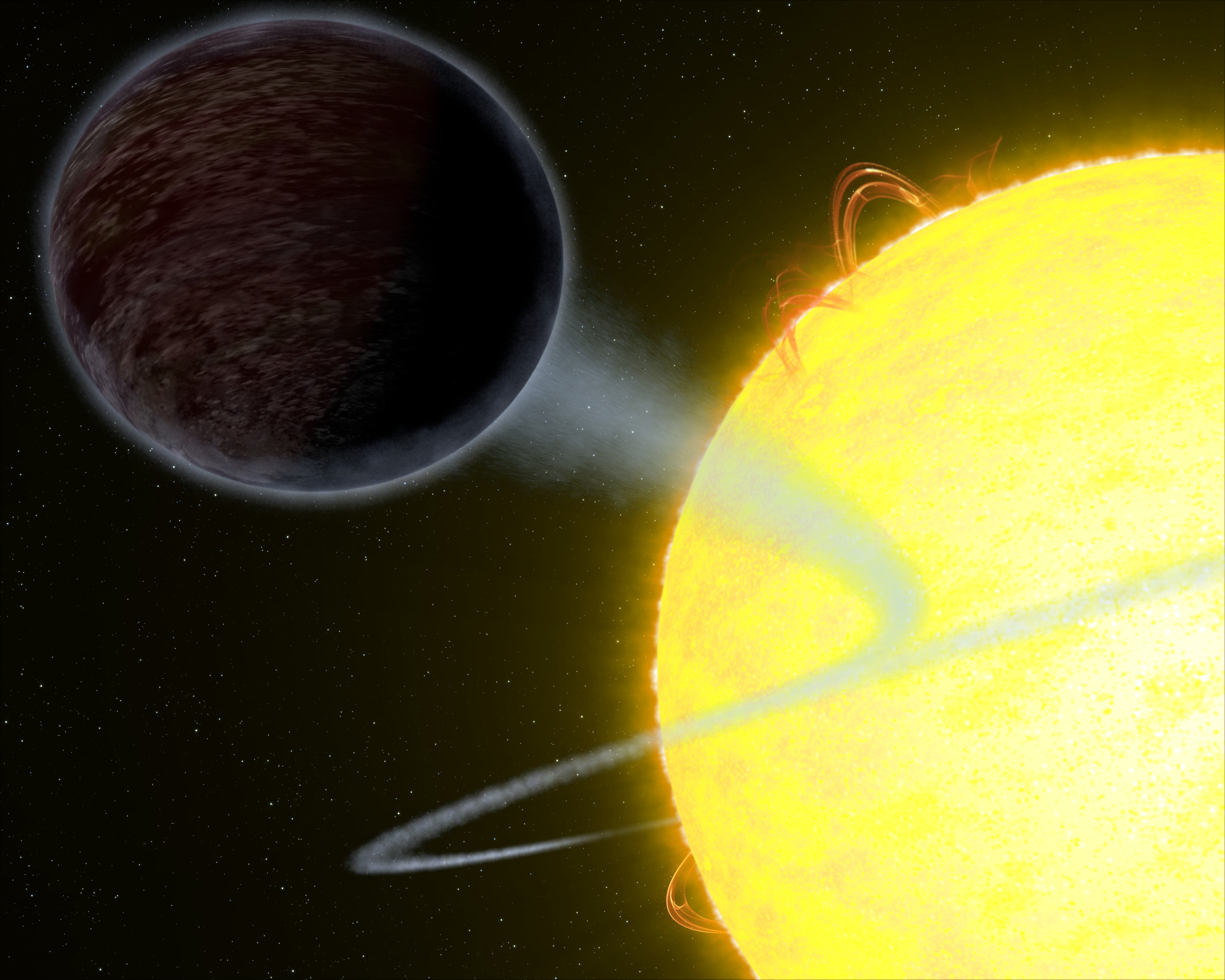
- Artist's depiction of WASP-12b's atmosphere being tidally stripped by its parent star to the point where WASP-12, the parent star has a ring of WASP-12b's debris

Discovery
- Discovered by: Cameron et al. (SuperWASP)
- Discovery site: SAAO
- Discovery date: April 2008
- Detection method: Transit

Orbital characteristics
- Semi-major axis: 0.0234+0.00056 −0.00050 AU
- Eccentricity: 0.049 ± 0.015
- Orbital period (sidereal): 1.0914199±0.0000002 d
- Inclination: 81.92°±1.51°
- Argument of periastron: −74°+13° −10°
- Star: WASP-12

Physical characteristics
- Mean radius: 1.937±0.056 R_{J}
- Mass: 1.47+0.076 −0.069 M_{J}
- Mean density: 0.266 g/cm^{3}
- Surface gravity: 3.004±0.015 g
- Temperature: 3,128+64 −68 K (2,885+64 −68 °C, 5,225+147 −155 °F)

WASP-12b is a hot Jupiter (a class of extrasolar planets) orbiting the star WASP-12, discovered in April of 2008, by the SuperWASP planetary transit survey. The planet takes only a little over one Earth day to orbit its star, in contrast to about 365.25 days for the Earth to orbit the Sun. Its distance from the star (approximately 3.5 million kilometers [2.2 million miles; 0.023 astronomical units]) is only $\textstyle\frac{1}{43}$ the Earth's distance from the Sun, with an eccentricity the same as Jupiter's. Consequently, it has one of the lowest densities for exoplanets ("inflated" by the flux of energy from the star). On December 3, 2013, scientists working with the Hubble Space Telescope (HST) reported detecting water in the atmosphere of the exoplanet. In July 2014, NASA announced finding very dry atmospheres on three exoplanets (HD 189733b, HD 209458b, WASP-12b) orbiting sun-like stars.

In September 2017, researchers working on the HST announced that WASP-12b reflects just 6% of the light that shines on its surface. As a result, its reflectivity has been described as "black as asphalt" and as "pitch black", although it is so hot that it emits a reddish glow.

== Characteristics ==
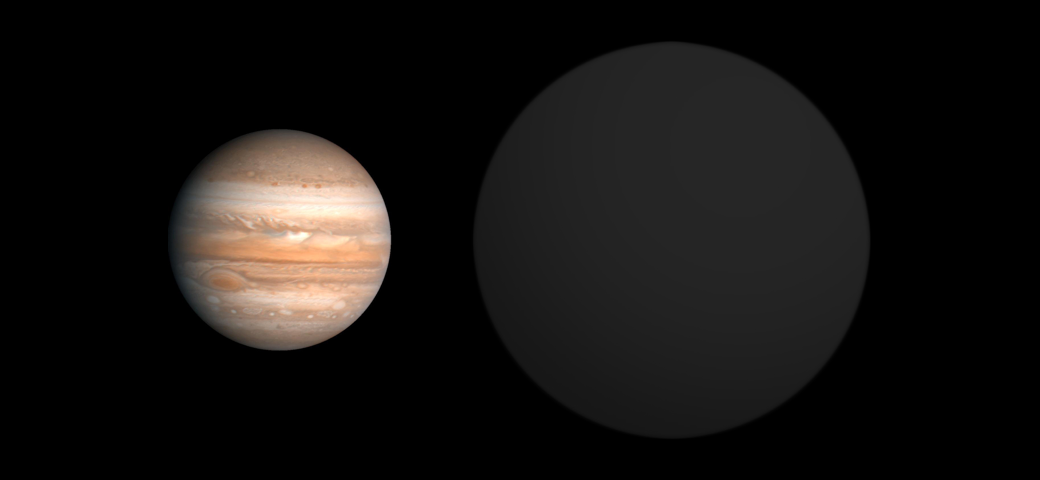
Size comparison of WASP-12b (right) with Jupiter

Since hot Jupiter exoplanets are tidally locked, one side is in permanent day while the other side is in permanent night, just as the same side of the Moon always faces the Earth. This is thought to induce a large flow of heat from the highly irradiated day side to the cooler night side, resulting in strong winds rushing around the planet's atmosphere.

Taylor Bell and Nicolas Cowan have pointed out that hydrogen will tend to be ionised on the day side. After flowing to the cooler face in a wind, it will then tend to recombine into neutral atoms, and thus will enhance the transport of heat.

The planet is so close to its star that its tidal forces are distorting it into a prolate spheroid and pulling away its atmosphere at a rate of about 10^{−7} M_{J} (about 189 quadrillion tons) per year (6 billion tons per second). The so-called "tidal heating", and the proximity of the planet to its star, combine to bring the surface temperature to more than 2,500 K (2,200 °C; 4,000 °F).

On May 20, 2010, the Hubble Space Telescope spotted WASP-12b being "consumed" by its star. Scientists had been aware that stars could consume planets; however, this was the first time such an event had been observed so clearly. It has been estimated that the planet has between 3 and 10 million years left of its life.

The Hubble Space Telescope observed the planet by using its Cosmic Origins Spectrograph (COS). The observations have confirmed predictions published in Nature in February 2009 by Peking University's Shu-lin Li. The planet's atmosphere has ballooned to be nearly three times the radius of Jupiter, while the planet itself has 40% more mass than Jupiter.

== Orbit ==
A study in 2012, utilizing the Rossiter–McLaughlin effect, determined that WASP-12b's orbit is strongly misaligned with the equatorial plane of its star by 59^{+15}_{−20}°.

A study from 2019 found that the time interval between two transits has decreased by 29 ± 2 msec/year since the discovery in 2008. The value was updated in 2020 to 32.53±1.62 msec/year, giving WASP-12b an estimated lifetime of 2.90±0.14 million years. The study came to the conclusion that the orbit of WASP-12b is decaying as a result of tidal interactions between the planet and the host star WASP-12. Due to this decay, the orbital period will get shorter and the planet will get closer to the host star, until it will become part of the star. The decay is much faster than the decay of WASP-19b, which does not show a decay with current data. In 2022, the decay rate was further refined to 29.81±0.94 msec/year, which corresponds to an estimated lifetime of 3.16±0.10 Ma.

=== Carbon content ===
Evidence reported in a 2010 study indicates that WASP-12b has an enhanced carbon-to-oxygen ratio, significantly higher than that of the Sun, indicating that it is a carbon-rich gas giant. The C/O ratio compatible with observations is about 1, while the solar value is 0.54. The C/O ratios suggest that carbon-rich planets may have formed in the star system. One of the researchers behind that study commented that "with more carbon than oxygen, you would get rocks of pure carbon, such as diamond or graphite".

The published study states, "Although carbon-rich giant planets like WASP-12b have not been observed, theory predicts myriad compositions for carbon-dominated solid planets. Terrestrial-sized carbon planets, for instance, could be dominated by graphite or diamond interiors, as opposed to the silicate composition of Earth." These remarks have led the media to pick up on the story, some even calling WASP-12b a "diamond planet".

The carbon content of the planet is located within its atmosphere, in the form of carbon monoxide and methane. The study appears in the journal Nature.

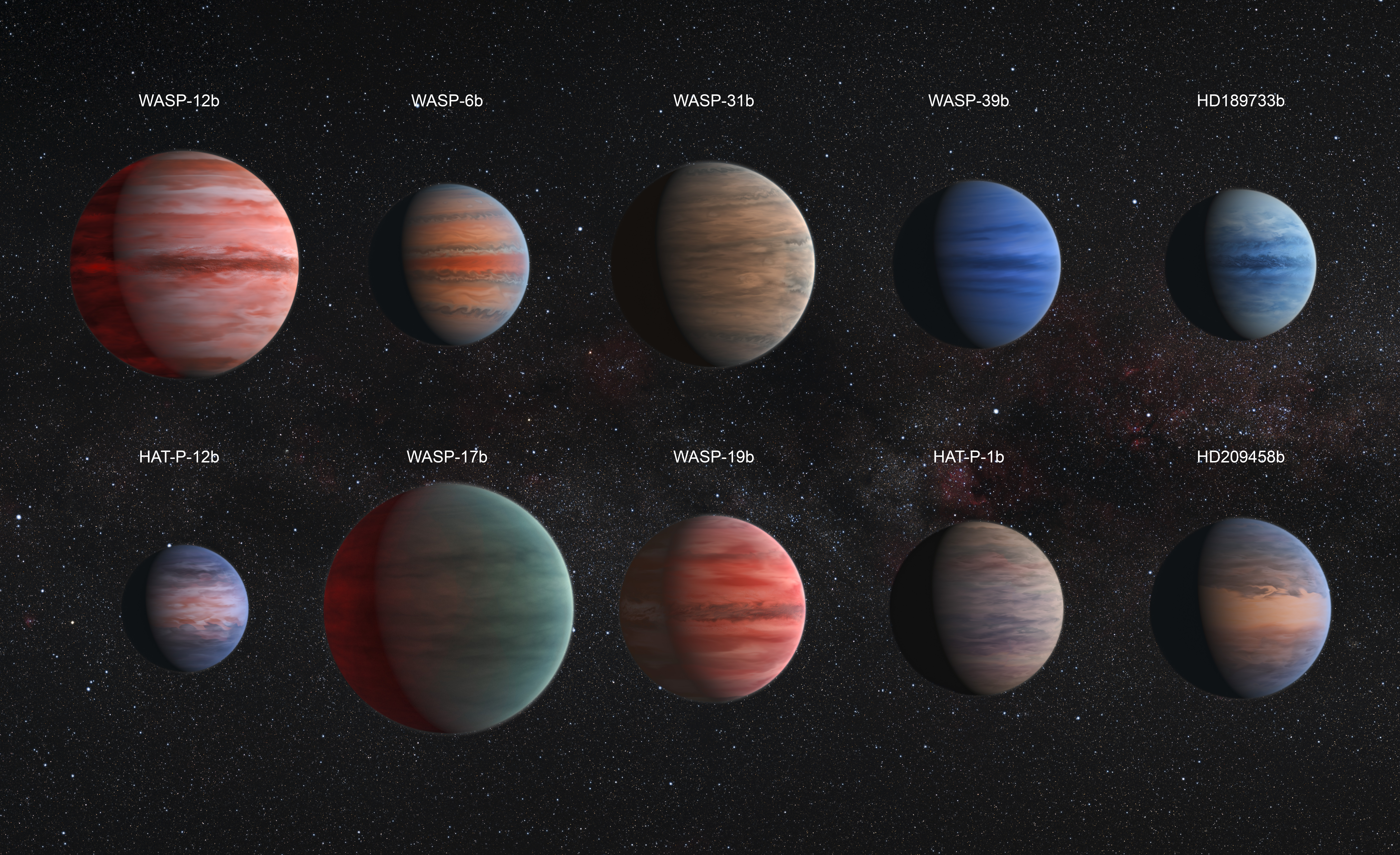
Comparison of "hot Jupiter" exoplanets – from top left to lower right: WASP-12b, WASP-6b, WASP-31b, WASP-39b, HD 189733 b, HAT-P-12b, WASP-17b, WASP-19b, HAT-P-1b and HD 209458 b

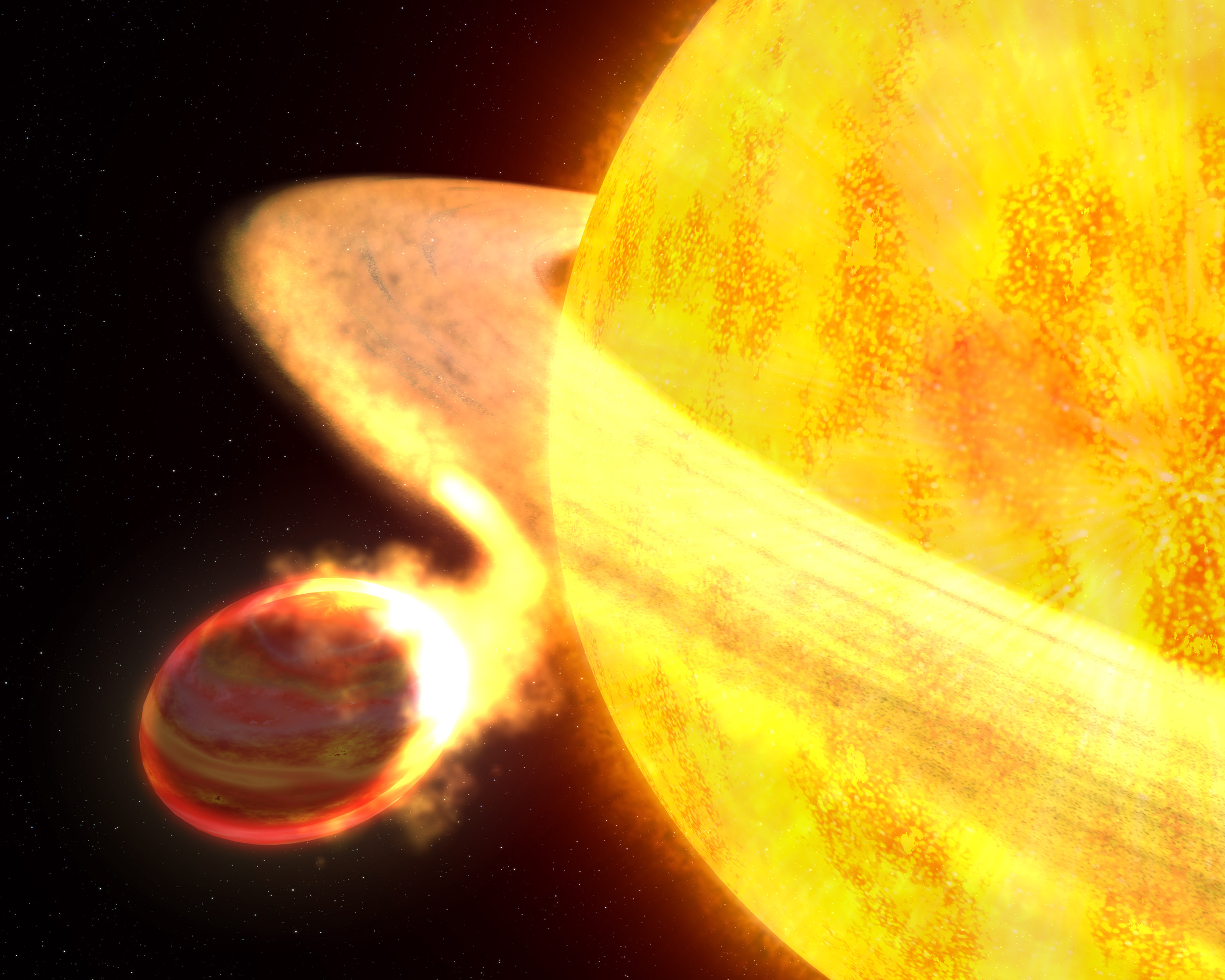
WASP-12b and its host star, WASP-12 (artist conception)

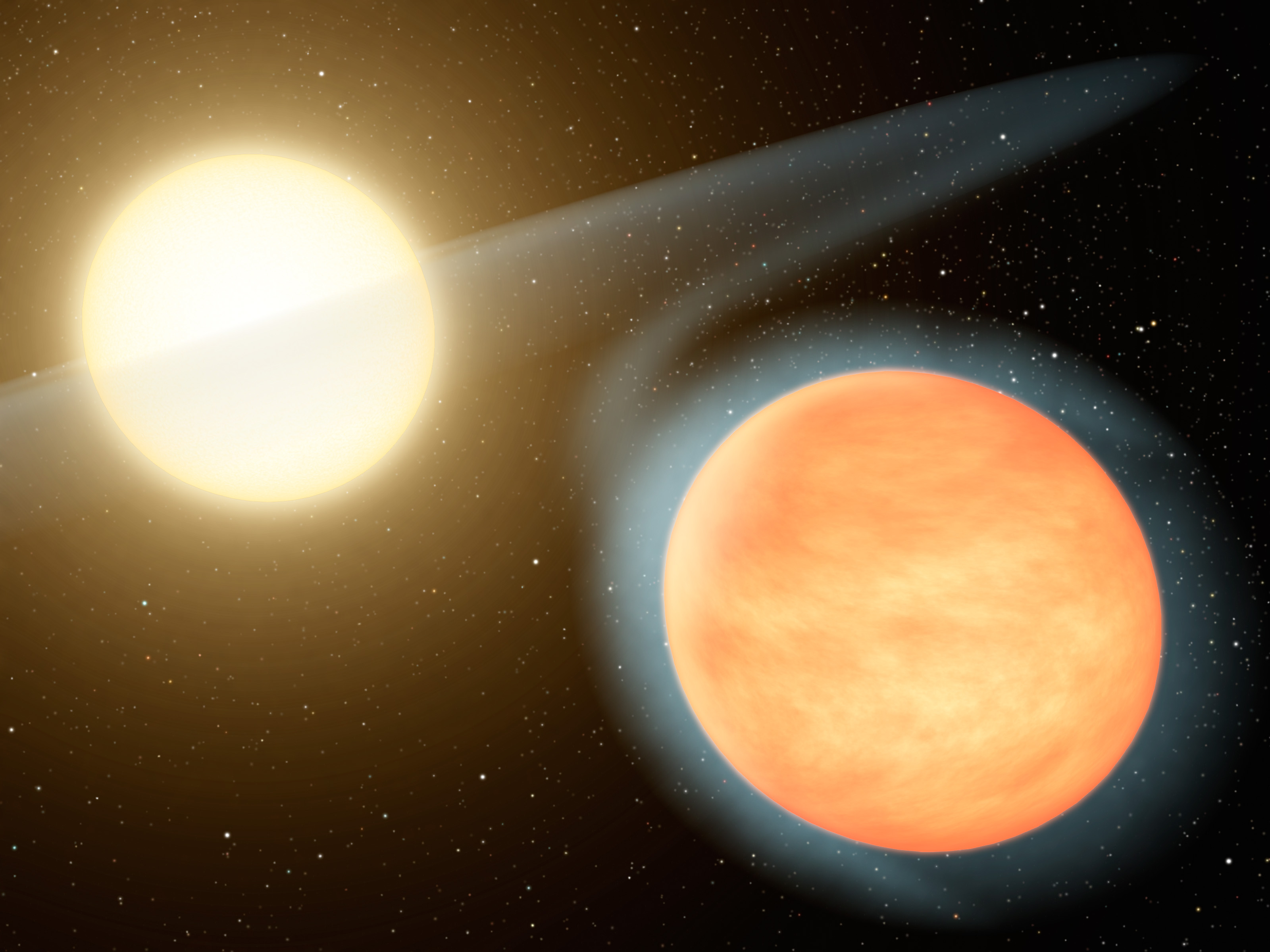
Hot, carbon-rich planet WASP-12b and its host star (Exoplanet color was unknown at the time of this artist conception.)

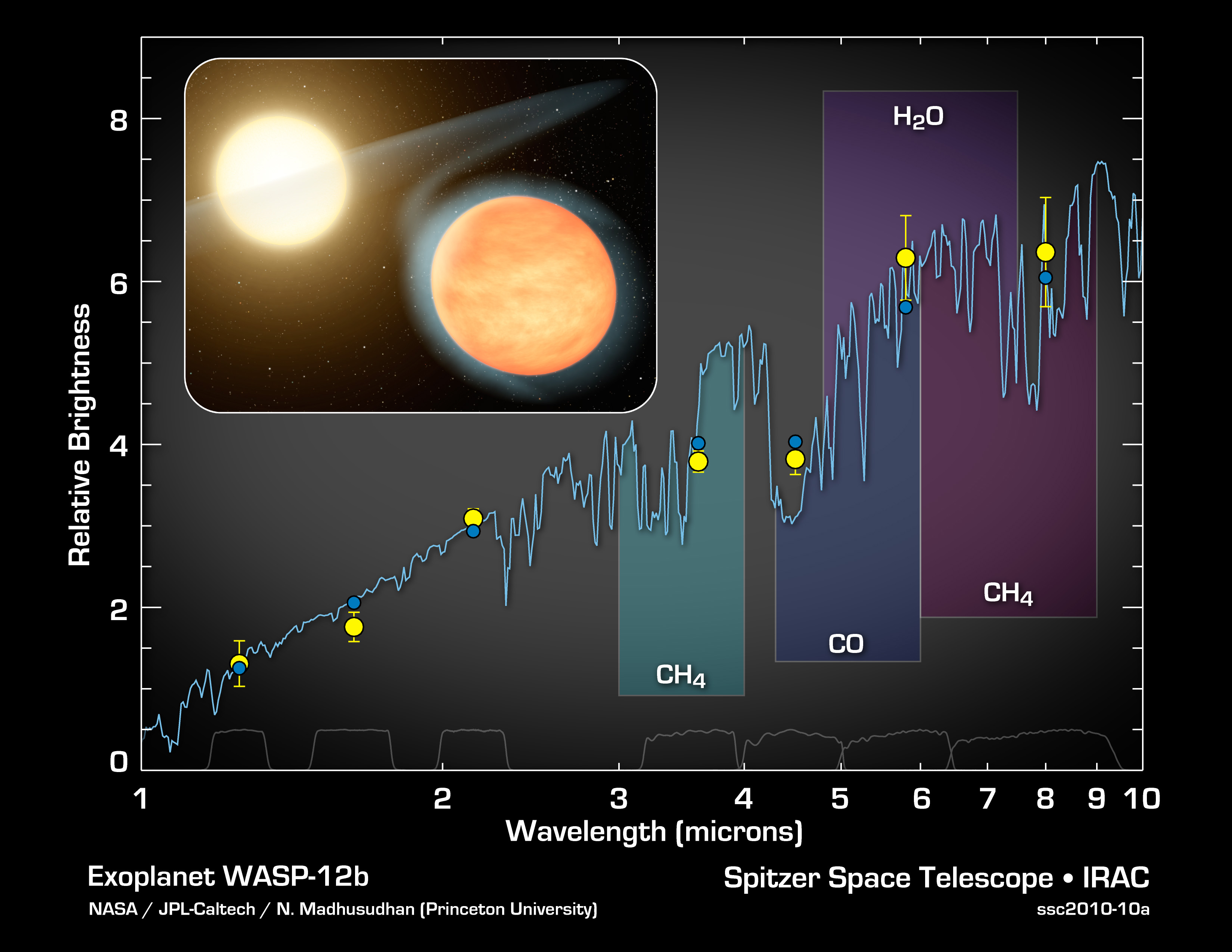
WASP-12b and its host star, WASP-12—with IR spectra noting the presence of various chemical molecules

== Candidate satellite ==
Russian astronomers studying a curve of change of shine of the planet observed regular variation of light that may arise from plasma torus surrounding at least one exomoon in orbit around WASP-12b. This is not expected, as hot Jupiter-type planets are expected to lose large moons within geologically short timescales. The satellite in question could instead be a Trojan body.

== See also ==
- TrES-2b, another low-albedo planet that absorbs over 90% of light
- WASP-103b, the first hot Jupiter to have its tidally stretched shape measured
- WASP-121b, another tidally stretched hot Jupiter
- PSR J2322−2650 b, a tidally stretched pulsar planet
