= WASP-39b =

Exoplanet in constellation of Virgo

WASP-39b / Bocaprins
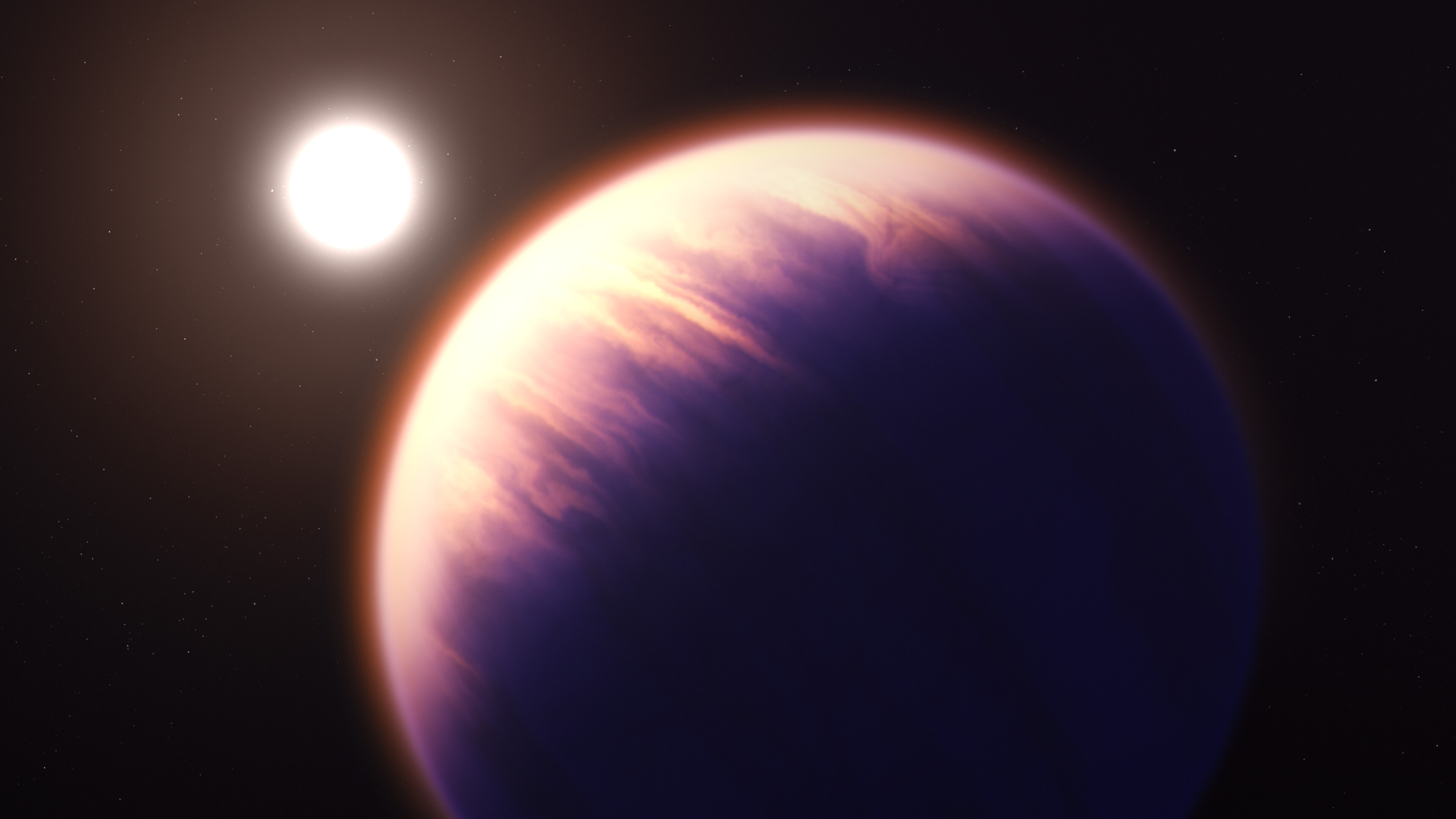
- Exoplanet WASP-39b artist's concept

Discovery
- Discovery site: WASP
- Discovery date: 2011
- Detection method: Transit

Designations
- Alternative names: Bocaprins

Orbital characteristics
- Semi-major axis: 0.0486 ± 0.0005 AU (7,270,000 ± 75,000 km)
- Eccentricity: <0.048
- Orbital period (sidereal): 4.05529470(97) d
- Inclination: 87.83+0.25 −0.22
- Semi-amplitude: 36.9+6.0 −5.3 m/s
- Star: WASP-39

Physical characteristics
- Mean radius: 1.27±0.04 R_{J} (91000±3000 km)
- Mass: 0.275+0.042 −0.043 M_{J}
- Mean density: 0.166+0.032 −0.029 g/cm^{3}

WASP-39b, officially named Bocaprins, is a hot Jupiter extrasolar planet discovered in February 2011 by the WASP project, notable for containing a substantial amount of water in its atmosphere. In addition Bocaprins was the first exoplanet found to contain carbon dioxide in its atmosphere, and likewise for sulfur dioxide.

Bocaprins orbits the star WASP-39 in the constellation Virgo, about 700 light-years from Earth. As part of the NameExoWorlds campaigns at the 100th anniversary of the IAU, the planet was named Bocaprins, after the beach Boca Prins in the Arikok National Park of Aruba.

== Characteristics ==
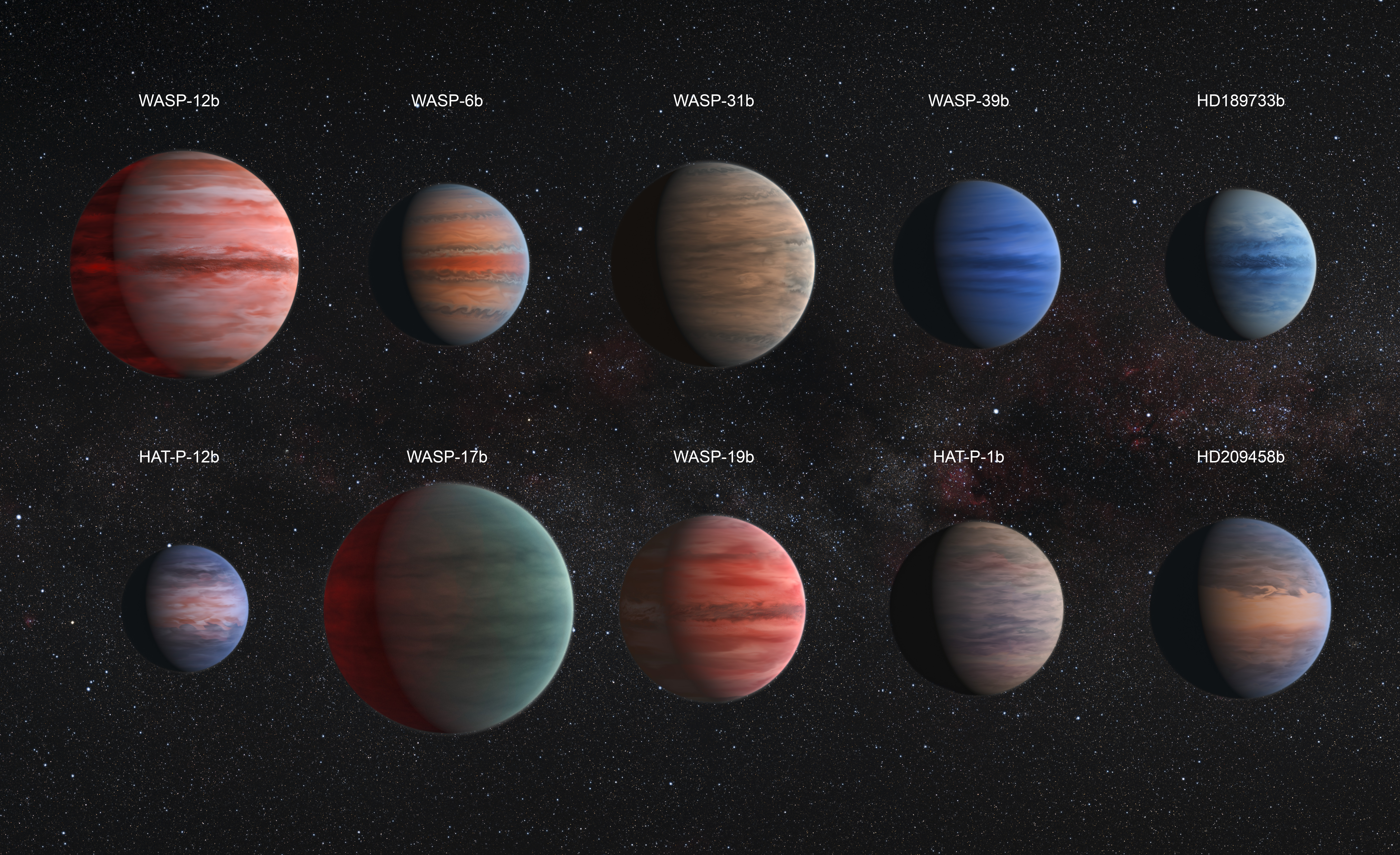
Comparison of "hot Jupiter" exoplanets, including Bocaprins (top row; 4th from left) (artist's concept). From top left to lower right: WASP-12b, WASP-6b, WASP-31b, WASP-39b, HD 189733b, HAT-P-12b, WASP-17b, WASP-19b, HAT-P-1b and HD 209458b.

Bocaprins has a mass of about 0.28 times that of Jupiter and a radius about 1.27 times that of Jupiter (91,000 km). It is a hot gas giant planet with a high temperature of 900 °C. The exoplanet orbits very close (7 million km) to WASP-39, its host star, every 4 Earth days.

JWST observations published in 2024 revealed significant atmospheric differences between the planet's morning and evening terminators, including an estimated temperature contrast of 177(+65 or -57)K. The morning terminators was found to be cooler and cloudier than the evening terminator.

Bocaprins is also notable for having an extremely low density, near that of WASP-17b. While WASP-17b has a density of 0.13±0.06 g/cm^{3}, WASP-39b has a slightly higher density of 0.18±0.04 g/cm^{3}.

== Atmospheric composition ==
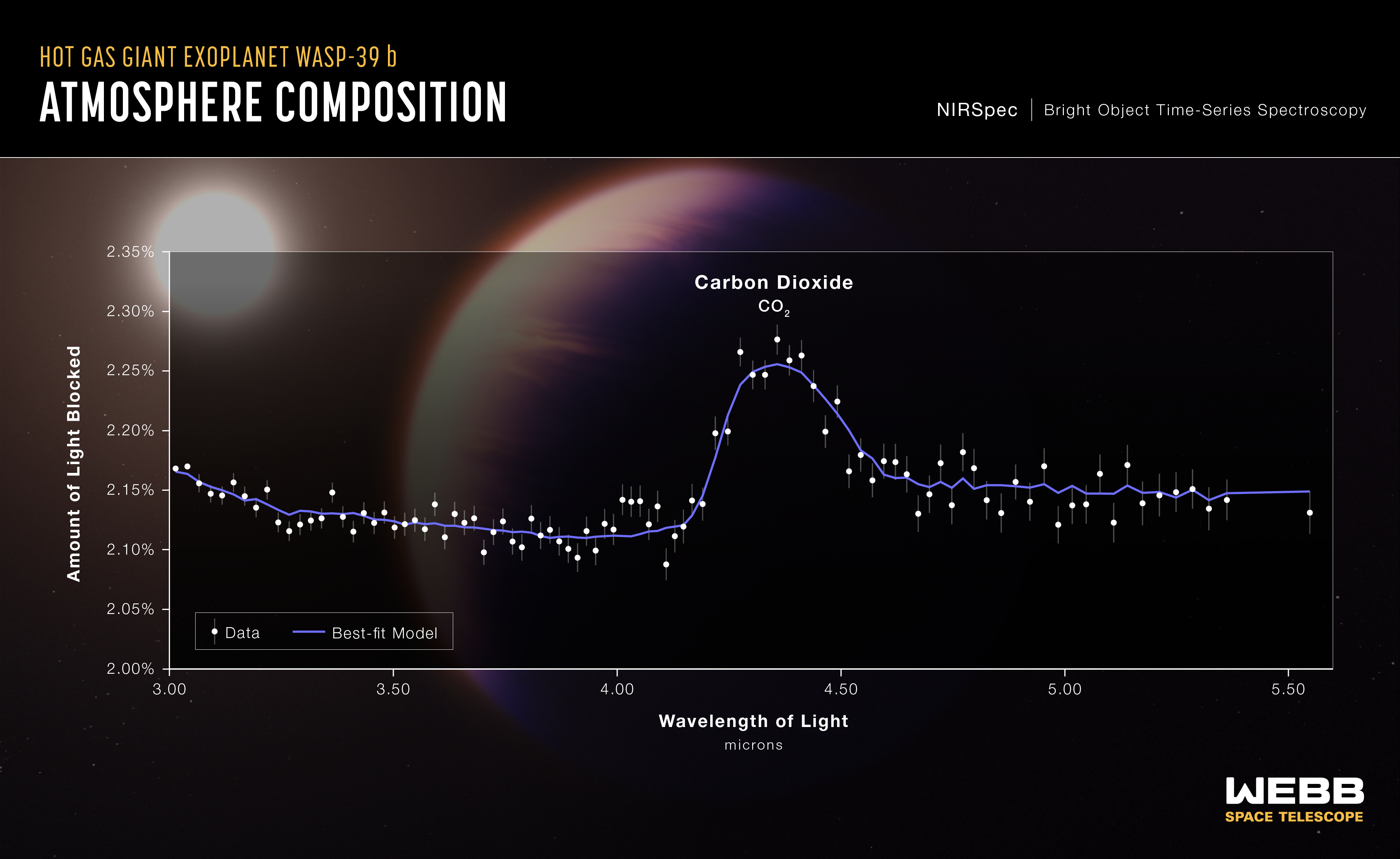
Bocaprins's atmospheric transmission spectrum captured by Webb’s Near-Infrared Spectrograph (NIRSpec) reveals first clear evidence for carbon dioxide in a planet outside the Solar System.

Hot water molecules were found in the atmosphere of Bocaprins in a 2018 study. The atmospheric transmission spectra, taken by different instruments, were inconsistent as in 2021, possibly indicating a disequilibrium atmospheric chemistry. High-fidelity spectra obtained by the James Webb Space Telescope in 2022 did not confirm a disequilibrium chemistry.

Bocaprins is one of the James Webb Space Telescope's early release science targets. Sulfur dioxide was observed in this planet's atmosphere for the first time, or indeed of any planet outside of the Solar System, indicating the existence of photochemical processes in the atmosphere. Bocaprins is the first exoplanet in which carbon dioxide has been detected.

Planetary transmission spectra taken in 2022 has indicated the atmosphere of Bocaprins is partially cloudy, and planet C/O ratio appears to be subsolar. The spectral signature of water, carbon dioxide, sodium and sulfur dioxide were also detected.

== See also ==
- WASP-6b
- WASP-17b
- WASP-19b
- WASP-31b
- WASP-121b
- List of proper names of exoplanets (see section Sources in References)
- List of transiting exoplanets
- List of exoplanets discovered in 2011
