= HAT-P-12b =

Extrasolar planet in constellation Canes Venatici

HAT-P-12b / Puli
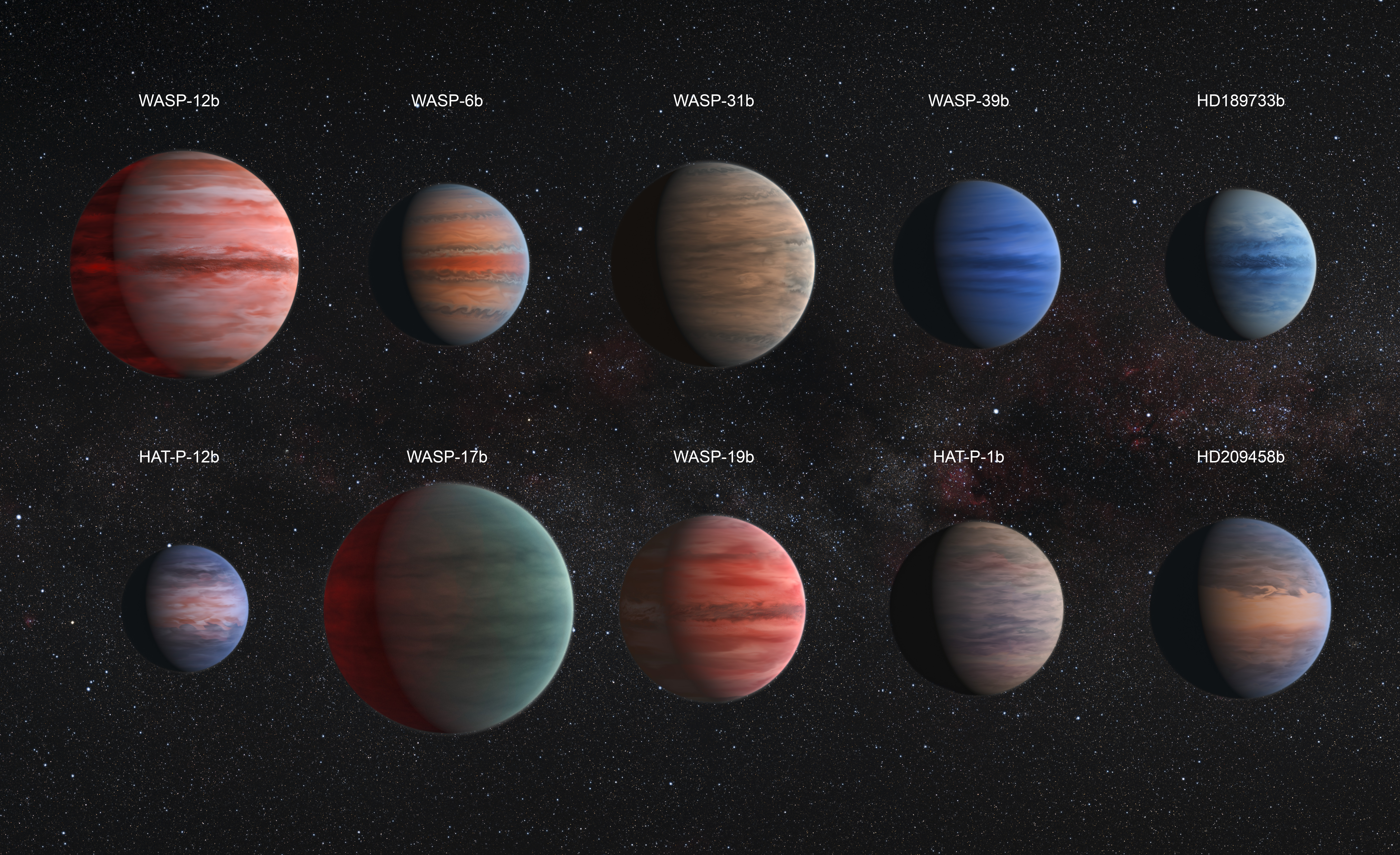
- Artist’s Impression of hot Jupiters (Puli is bottom left)

Discovery
- Discovered by: Hartman et al.
- Discovery site: Cambridge, Massachusetts
- Discovery date: April 29, 2009
- Detection method: Transit

Designations
- Alternative names: Puli

Orbital characteristics
- Semi-major axis: 0.0384 ± 0.0003 AU (5,745,000 ± 45,000 km)
- Eccentricity: 0 (assumed)
- Orbital period (sidereal): 3.2130598±0.0000021 d
- Inclination: 89.0±0.4
- Star: HAT-P-12

Physical characteristics
- Mean radius: 0.959+0.029 −0.021 R_{J}
- Mass: 0.211±0.012 M_{J}
- Mean density: 0.295 ± 0.025 g/cm^{3}

HAT-P-12b, formally named Puli, is an extrasolar planet approximately 468 light years away from Earth, orbiting the 13th magnitude K-type star HAT-P-12, which is located in the constellation Canes Venatici. It is a transiting hot Jupiter that was discovered by the HATNet Project on April 29, 2009.

HAT-P-12b is a H/He-dominated gas giant planet with a core mass of 11.3^{+2.6}_{−2.1} M_{🜨} and is moderately irradiated by its low-metallicity host star. Therefore, HAT-P-12b is most likely an H/He-dominated planet with a core of perhaps ~10 M_{🜨}, and a total metal fraction of ~15%. At the time of its discovery, this made HAT-P-12b the least massive H/He-dominated gas giant planet found to date; the previous record holder was Saturn.

In 2020, the obtained transmission spectra have revealed that the atmosphere of HAT-P-12b is cloudy, with haze above cloud tops. Water was detected. The prevalence of clouds and hazes in planetary atmosphere was disputed in 2021 though.

In August 2022, this planet and its host star were included among 20 systems to be named by the third NameExoWorlds project. The approved names, proposed by a team from Hungary, were announced in June 2023. HAT-P-12b is named Puli and its host star is named Komondor, after the Hungarian Puli and Komondor dog breeds.

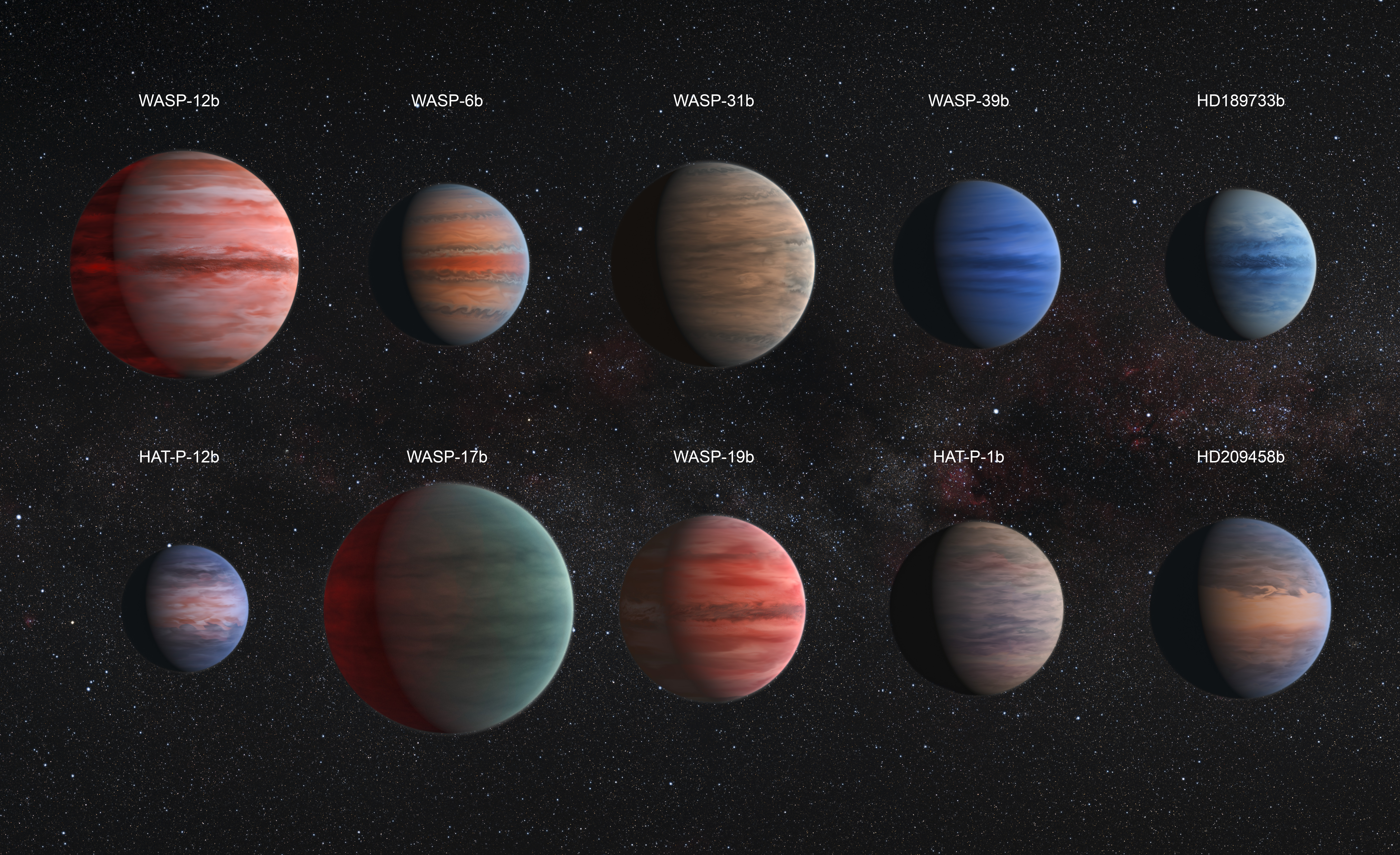
Comparison of "hot Jupiter" exoplanets (artist concept). From top left to lower right: WASP-12b, WASP-6b, WASP-31b, WASP-39b, HD 189733b, HAT-P-12b, WASP-17b, WASP-19b, HAT-P-1b and HD 209458b.
