= WASP-17 =

Star in the constellation Scorpius

WASP-17 / Dìwö
Observation data Epoch J2000.0 Equinox ICRS
- Constellation: Scorpius
- Right ascension: 15^{h} 59^{m} 50.9492^{s}
- Declination: −28° 03′ 42.313″
- Apparent magnitude (V): 11.500

Characteristics
- Evolutionary stage: main sequence
- Spectral type: F6V

Astrometry
Radial velocity (R_{v})	−48.34±1.07 km/s
Proper motion (μ)	RA: −8.263(29) mas/yr Dec.: −9.427(22) mas/yr
Parallax (π)	2.4811±0.0255 mas
Distance	1,310 ± 10 ly (403 ± 4 pc)

Details
Mass	1.56±0.30 M_{☉}
Radius	1.494±0.063 R_{☉}
Luminosity	4.0±0.2 L_{☉}
Surface gravity (log g)	4.29±0.08 cgs
Temperature	6689±112 K
Metallicity [Fe/H]	$\begin{smallmatrix}\left[\ce{M}/\ce{H}\right]\end{smallmatrix}$ = −0.190±0.065 dex
Rotational velocity (v sin i)	10.6±1.3 km/s
Age	2.65±0.25 Gyr

Other designations
- Dìwö, CD−27 10695, TOI-1050, TIC 66818296, WASP-17, TYC 6787-1927-1, 2MASS J15595095-2803422, 1SWASP J155950.94−280342.3

Database references
SIMBAD	data
Exoplanet Archive	data

WASP-17, also named Dìwö, is an F-type main sequence star approximately 1,310 light-years away in the constellation Scorpius. It hosts the planet WASP-17b.

The star is depleted of carbon. The carbon to oxygen molar ratio of 0.18±0.04 for WASP-17 is well below the solar ratio of 0.55.

== Nomenclature ==
The planet was discovered by the SuperWASP project, hence the name WASP-17.

This was one of the systems selected to be named in the 2019 NameExoWorlds campaign during the 100th anniversary of the IAU, which assigned each country a star and planet to be named. This system was assigned to Costa Rica. WASP-17 is named Dìwö, which in the Bribri language means the Sun, and its planet is named Ditsö̀.

== Planetary system ==
As of 2009, an exoplanet has been confirmed to orbit the star. The planet, WASP-17b, is unusual in that it is believed to orbit in the opposite direction to the star's spin (a retrograde orbit), and is twice the size of Jupiter, but half its mass. The planet is also named Ditsö̀. It is subject to intensive photo-evaporation, and may be completely destroyed within one billion years from now.

The WASP-17 planetary system
Companion (in order from star)	Mass	Semimajor axis (AU)	Orbital period (days)	Eccentricity	Inclination (°)	Radius
b / Ditsö̀	0.512±0.037 M_{J}	0.05151±0.00035	3.7354845(19)	<0.020	86.83+0.68 −0.53	1.875±0.084 R_{J}
