= WASP-17b =

Hot-Jupiter exoplanet in the orbit of the star WASP-17

WASP-17b / Ditsö̀
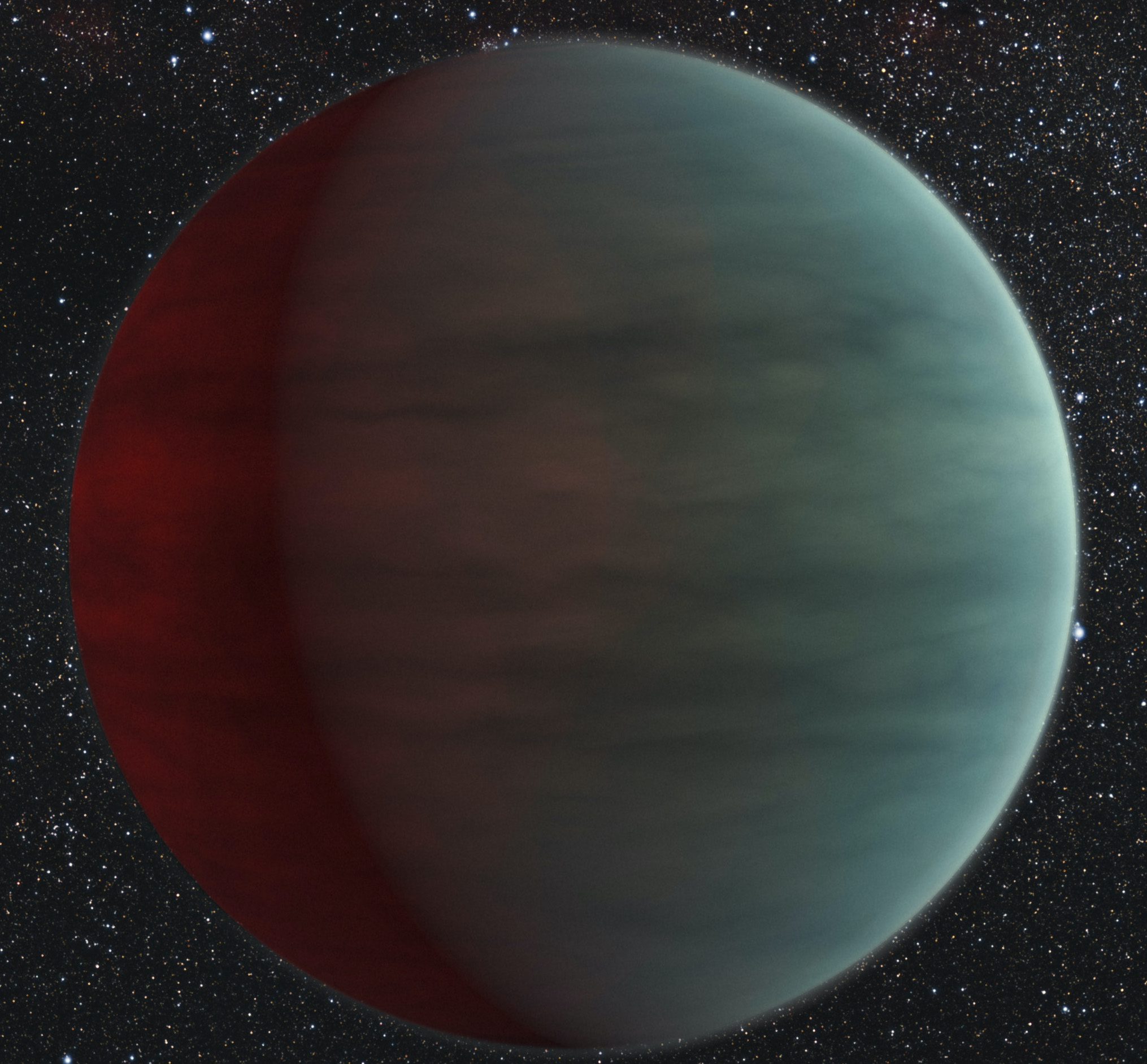
- Artist impression of Ditsö̀

Discovery
- Discovered by: David R. Anderson et al
- Discovery date: 11 August 2009
- Detection method: Transit (including secondary eclipse)

Orbital characteristics
- Semi-major axis: 0.05151±0.00035 AU
- Eccentricity: <0.020
- Orbital period (sidereal): 3.7354845±0.0000019 d
- Inclination: 86.83°+0.68° −0.53°
- Argument of periastron: −70 or 210
- Semi-amplitude: 56.0+4.1 −4.0 m/s
- Star: WASP-17

Physical characteristics
- Mean radius: 1.875±0.084 R_{J}
- Mass: 0.512±0.037 M_{J}
- Mean density: 0.080+0.013 −0.011 g/cm^{3}
- Temperature: 1,550+170 −200 K

WASP-17b, officially named Ditsö̀, is an exoplanet in the constellation Scorpius that is orbiting the star WASP-17. Its discovery was announced on 11 August 2009. It is the first planet discovered to have a retrograde orbit, meaning it orbits in a direction counter to the rotation of its host star. This discovery challenged traditional planetary formation theory. In terms of diameter, WASP-17b is one of the largest exoplanets discovered and at half Jupiter's mass, this made it the most puffy planet known in 2010. On 3 December 2013, scientists working with the Hubble Space Telescope reported detecting water in the exoplanet's atmosphere.

WASP-17b's name was selected in the NameExoWorlds campaign by Costa Rica, during the 100th anniversary of the International Astronomical Union. Ditsö̀ is the name that the god Sibö̀ gave to the first Bribri people in Talamancan mythology.

== Discovery ==
A team of researchers led by David Anderson of Keele University in Staffordshire, England, discovered the gas giant, which is about 1,000 light-years (310 parsecs) from Earth, by observing it transiting its host star WASP-17. Such photometric observations also reveal the planet's size. The discovery was made with a telescope array at the South African Astronomical Observatory. Due to the involvement of the Wide Angle Search for Planets (SuperWASP) consortium of universities, the exoplanet, as the 17th found to date by this group, was given its present name.

Astronomers at the Observatory of Geneva were then able to use characteristic redshifts and blueshifts in the host star's spectrum as its radial velocity varied over the course of the planet's orbit to measure the planet's mass and obtain an indication of its orbital eccentricity. Careful examination of the Doppler shifts during transits also allowed them to determine the direction of the planet's orbital motion relative to its parent star's rotation via the Rossiter–McLaughlin effect.

== Orbit ==
WASP-17b is thought to have a retrograde orbit (with a sky-projected inclination of the orbit normal against the stellar spin axis of about 149°, not to be confused with the line-of-sight inclination of the orbit, given in the table, which is near 90° for all transiting planets), which would make it the first planet discovered to have such an orbital motion. It was found by measuring the Rossiter–McLaughlin effect of the planet on the star's Doppler signal as it transited, in which whichever of the star's hemispheres is turning toward or away from Earth will show a slight blueshift or redshift which is dampened by the transiting planet. Scientists are not yet sure why the planet orbits opposite to the star's rotation. Theories include a gravitational slingshot resulting from a near-collision with another planet, or the intervention of a smaller planet-like body working to gradually change WASP-17b's orbit by tilting it via the Kozai mechanism. Spin-orbit angle measurement was updated in 2012 to −148.7^{+7.7}_{−6.7}°.

== Physical properties ==
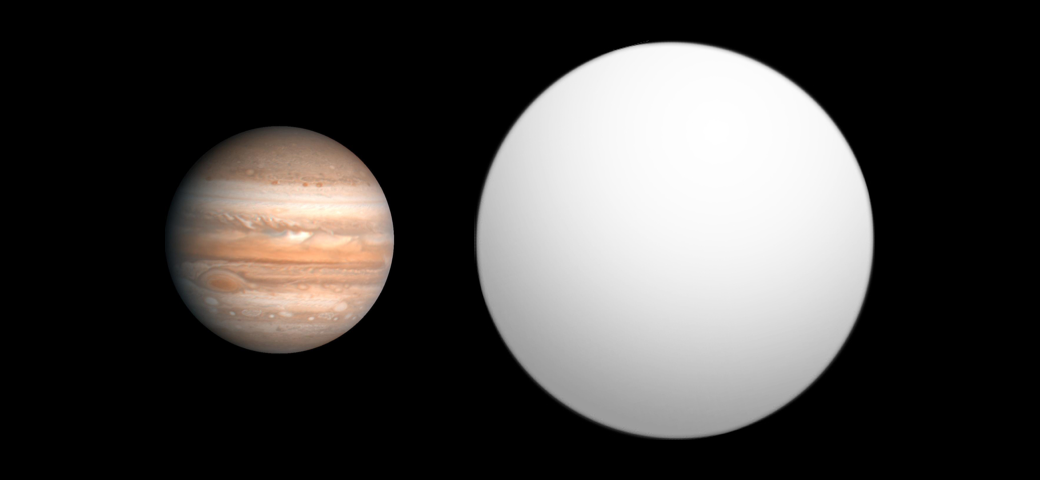
Size comparison of Jupiter with Ditsö̀

WASP-17b has a radius between 1.5 and 2 times that of Jupiter and about half the mass. Thus its mean density is between 0.08 and 0.19 g/cm^{3}, compared with Jupiter's 1.326 g/cm^{3} and Earth's 5.515 g/cm^{3} (the density of water is 1 g/cm^{3}). The unusually low density is thought to be a consequence of a combination of the planet's orbital eccentricity and its proximity to its parent star (less than one seventh of the distance between Mercury and the Sun), leading to tidal flexing and heating of its interior. The same mechanism is behind the intense volcanic activity of Jupiter's moon Io. WASP-39b has a similarly low estimated density.

Exoplanetary sodium in the atmosphere of the WASP-17 has been detected in 2018, but was not confirmed by 2021. Instead, the spectral signatures of water, aluminium oxide (AlO) and titanium hydride (TiH) were detected. The water signature was confirmed in 2022, together with carbon dioxide absorption. In 2023, evidence of clouds made of quartz was detected on the planet by the James Webb Space Telescope.

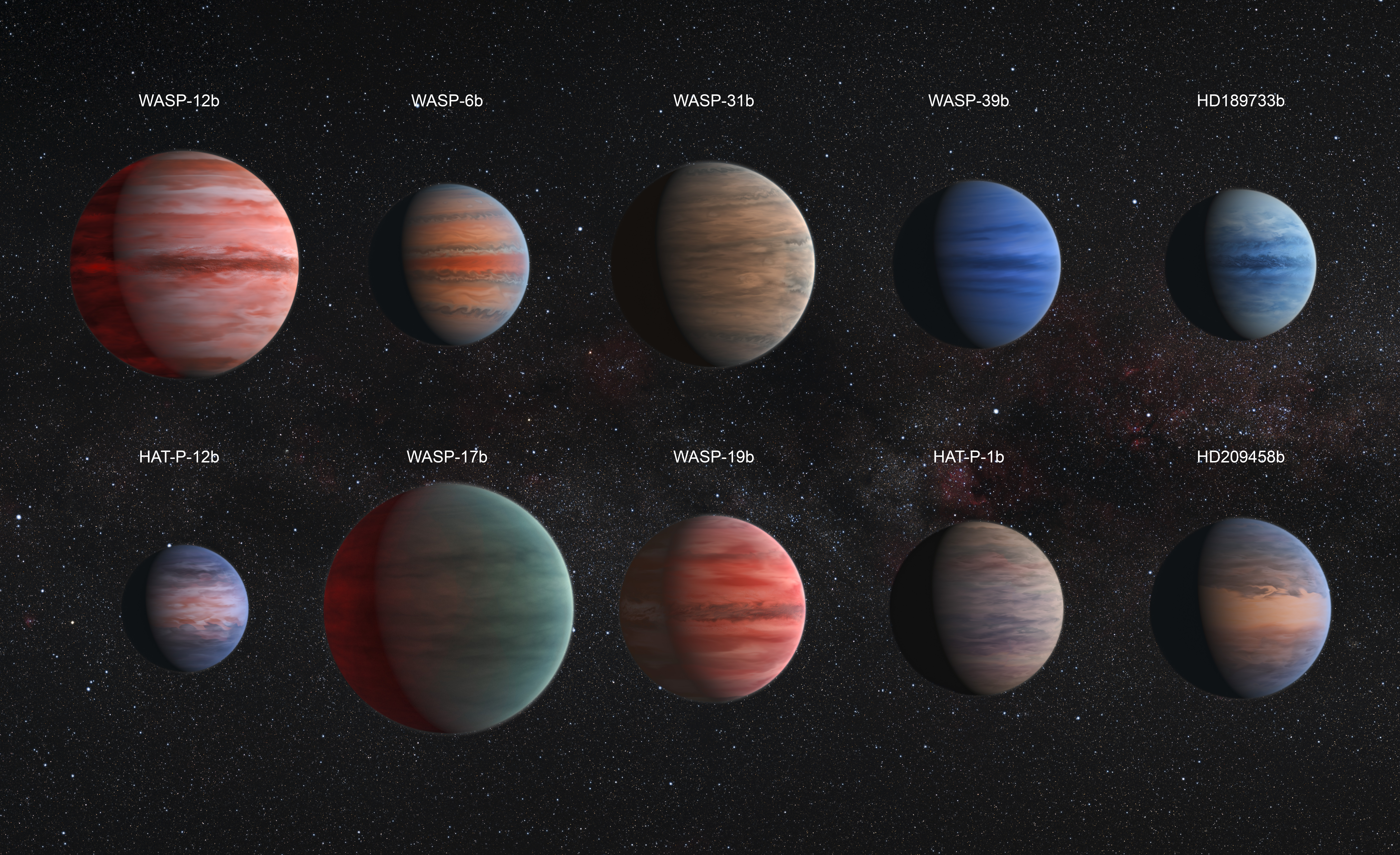
Comparison of "hot Jupiter" exoplanets (artist concept) From top left to lower right: WASP-12b, WASP-6b, WASP-31b, WASP-39b, HD 189733 b, HAT-P-12b, WASP-17b, WASP-19b, HAT-P-1b and HD 209458 b

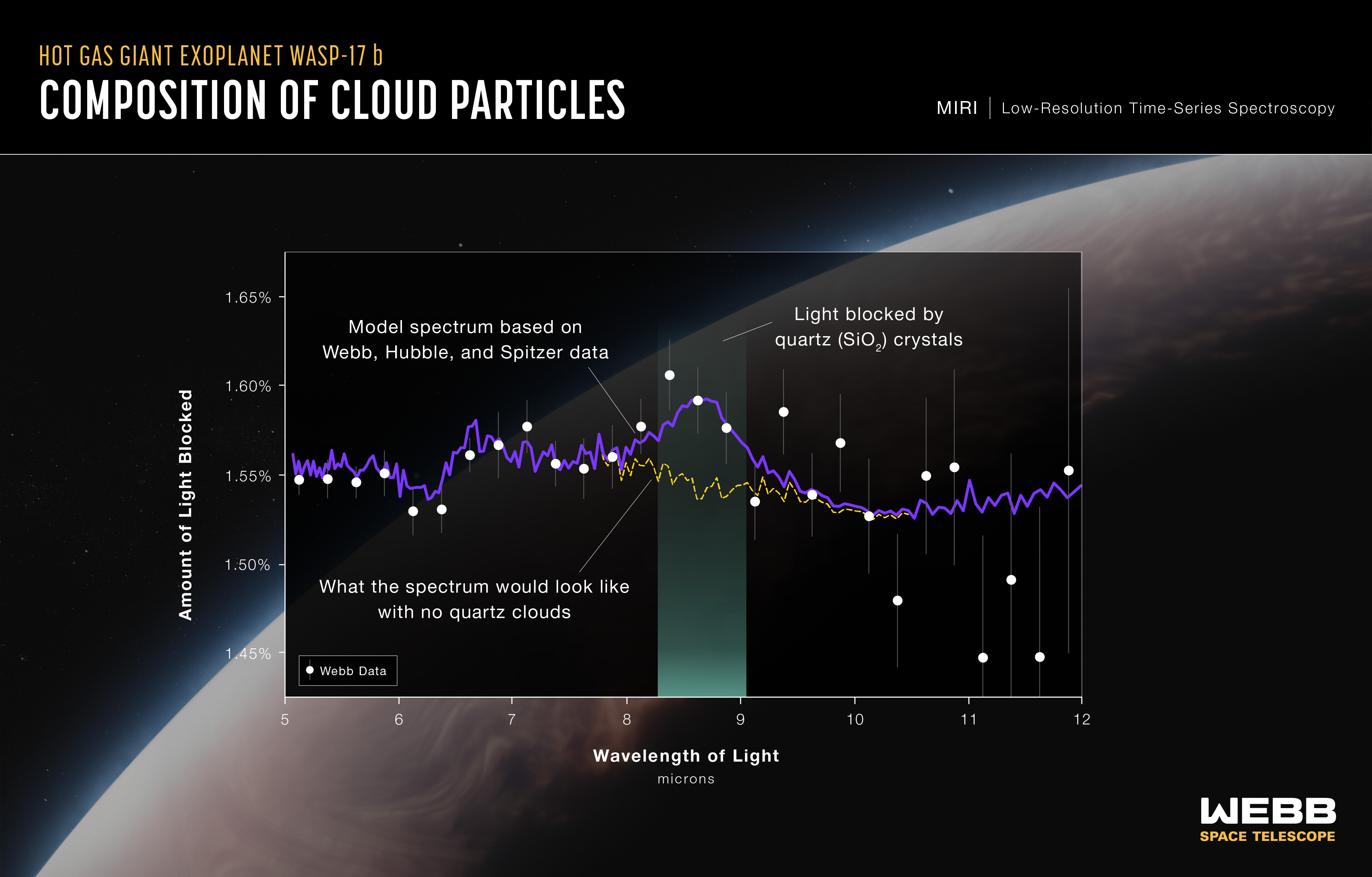
This is a transmission spectrum of the hot gas giant exoplanet WASP-17 b captured by Webb's Mid-Infrared Instrument (MIRI) on 12–13 March 2023. It reveals the first evidence for quartz (crystalline silica, SiO_{2}) in the clouds of an exoplanet.

== See also ==
- HAT-P-7b, another exoplanet announced to have a retrograde orbit the day after the WASP-17b announcement
- TrES-4b, another large exoplanet with a low density
- List of exoplanet extremes
