= WASP-19b =

Extrasolar planet in the constellation Vela

WASP-19b / Banksia
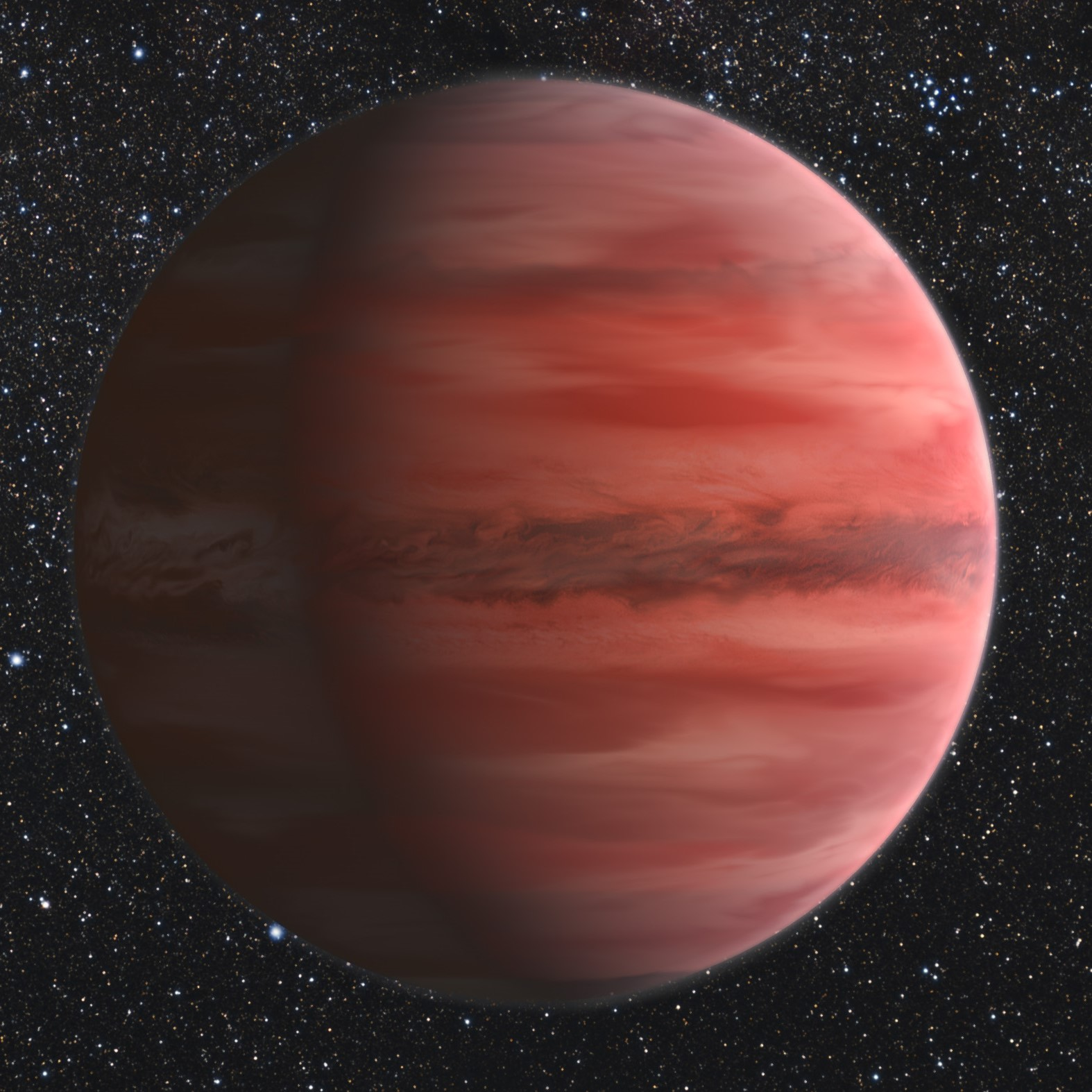
- Artist's impression of WASP-19b by ESA/Hubble

Discovery
- Discovered by: Hebb et al. (SuperWASP)
- Discovery date: December 10, 2009
- Detection method: Transit

Designations
- Alternative names: Banksia

Orbital characteristics
- Semi-major axis: 0.01655 ± 0.00013 AU (2,476,000 ± 19,000 km)
- Eccentricity: 0.0046+0.0044 −0.0028
- Orbital period (sidereal): 0.79 ± 0.0000003 d (18.9600000 ± 7.2×10^{−6} h; 68,256.000 ± 0.026 s)
- Inclination: 79.4±0.4
- Star: WASP-19

Physical characteristics
- Mean radius: 1.410+0.017 −0.013; R_{J}
- Mass: 1.139+0.030 −0.020 M_{J}
- Mean density: 0.68 g/cm^{3}
- Albedo: <0.26; 0.16±0.04
- Temperature: 2350+168 −314 K 2240±40 K

WASP-19b, formally named Banksia, is an exoplanet, notable for possessing one of the shortest orbital periods of any known planetary body: 0.79 days or approximately 18.932 hours. It has a mass close to that of Jupiter (1.15 Jupiter masses), but by comparison has a much larger radius (1.31 times that of Jupiter, or 0.13 Solar radii); making it nearly the size of a low-mass star. It orbits the star WASP-19 in the constellation Vela. At the time of discovery it was the shortest period hot Jupiter discovered as planets with shorter orbital periods had a rocky, or metallic composition.

A study in 2012, utilizing the Rossiter–McLaughlin effect, determined the planetary orbit is well aligned with the equatorial plane of the star, misalignment equal to -15±11°.

In 2013, secondary eclipse and orbital phases were barely observed from the data gathered with ASTEP telescope, making it the first detection of such kind through ground-based observations. This was possible due to the large size of the planet and its small semi-major axis.

In 2019 the planet was observed with TESS and the eclipse of the planet was measured. The broad variations caused by the changing aspect of the heated face of the planet were measured. The study deduced that the dayside has a temperature of 2240 ± 40 K (1967 ± 40 °C) and that the planet reflects 16 ± 4 percent of the light that falls on it. The last value is relatively high compared to other planets.

Despite the short orbital period, orbital decay of WASP-19b was not detected as of 2019.

== Nomenclature ==
In August 2022, this planet and its host star were included among 20 systems to be named by the third NameExoWorlds project. The approved names, proposed by a team from Brandon Park Primary School in Wheelers Hill (Melbourne, Australia), led by scientist Lance C. Kelly and teacher David Maierhofer were announced in June 2023. WASP-19b is named Banksia and its host star is named Wattle, after the Banksia and wattle plants.

== Atmosphere ==
In December 2013, scientists working with the Hubble Space Telescope reported detecting water in the atmosphere of the exoplanet.

In September 2017, astronomers using the Very Large Telescope at the European Southern Observatory reported the detection of titanium oxide (TiO) in WASP-19b's atmosphere. This was the first time titanium oxide had been detected in an exoplanet atmosphere. They also detected a strongly scattering haze in the atmosphere as well as the element sodium, and additionally found the presence of water vapour. Strong haze and barely discernible titanium oxide signal were confirmed in 2021, while no sign of water or alkali metals could be found. The presence of water vapour was confirmed in a 2025 study with JWST, along with evidences for carbon monoxide, carbon dioxide, methane (CH_{4}) and acetylene (C_{2}H_{2}).

A study using TESS data concluded that the atmosphere of WASP-19b is moderately efficient at transporting heat from the dayside to the nightside.

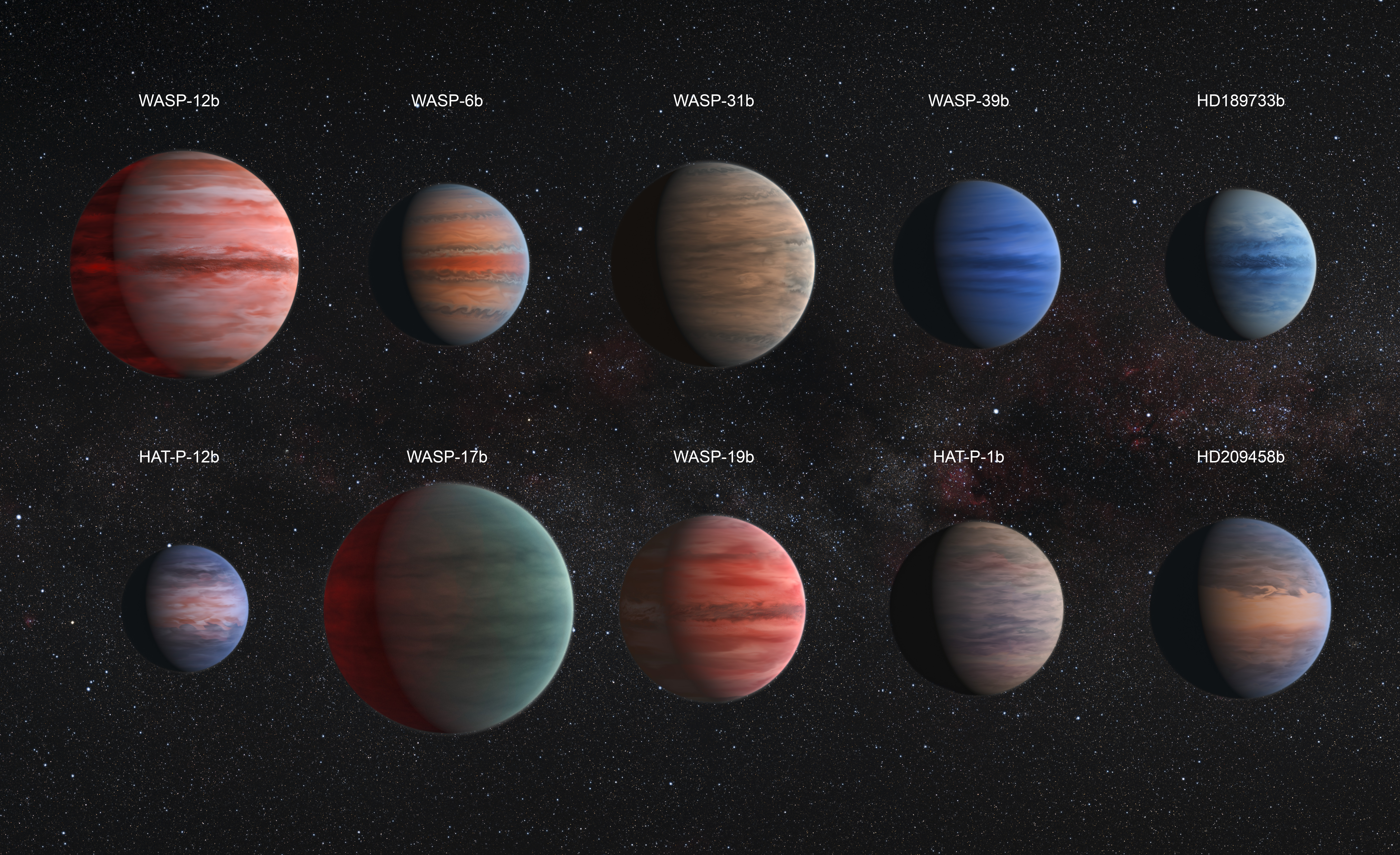
Comparison of "hot Jupiter" exoplanets (artist concept). From top left to lower right: WASP-12b, WASP-6b, WASP-31b, WASP-39b, HD 189733b, HAT-P-12b, WASP-17b, WASP-19b, HAT-P-1b and HD 209458b.
