= HAT-P-1b =

Hot Jupiter orbiting HAT-P-1

HAT-P-1 b
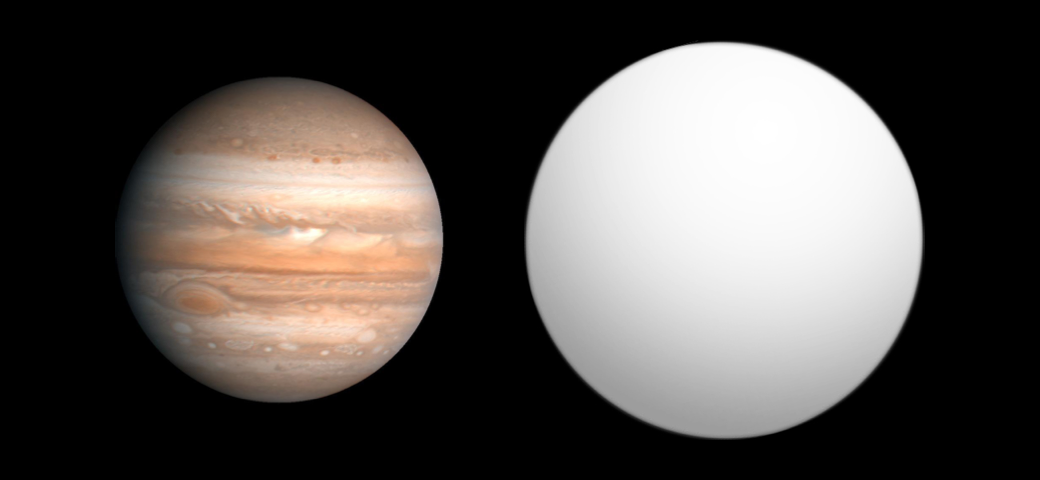
- Size comparison of HAT-P-1b with Jupiter

Discovery
- Discovered by: HATNet Project
- Discovery site: Arizona and Hawaii
- Discovery date: Thurs, Sept 14, 2006
- Detection method: Transit, radial velocity

Orbital characteristics
- Semi-major axis: 0.05561 ± 0.00083 AU (8,319,000 ± 124,000 km)
- Eccentricity: <0.067
- Orbital period (sidereal): 4.4652968 ± 0.0000018 d
- Inclination: 85.634 ± 0.056
- Semi-amplitude: 59.3 ± 1.4
- Star: HAT-P-1 (ADS 16402 B)

Physical characteristics
- Mean radius: 1.319 ± 0.019 R_{J}
- Mass: 0.529 ± 0.020 M_{J}
- Temperature: 1,322 ± 15 K

HAT-P-1b is an extrasolar planet orbiting the Sun-like star HAT-P-1, also known as ADS 16402 B. HAT-P-1 is the dimmer component of the ADS 16402 binary star system. It is located roughly 521 light-years away from Earth in the constellation Lacerta. HAT-P-1b is among the least dense of any of the known extrasolar planets.

== Discovery ==
HAT-P-1b was detected by searching for astronomical transits of the parent star by orbiting planets. As the planet passes in front of its parent star (as seen from Earth), it blocks a small amount of the light reaching us from the star. HAT-P-1b was first detected by a dip of 0.6% in the light from the star. This enabled determination of the planet's radius and orbital period. The discovery was made by the HATNet Project (Hungarian Automated Telescope Network) using telescopes at the Fred Lawrence Whipple Observatory on Mount Hopkins in Arizona and at the Submillimeter Array facility in Hawaii. It was confirmed and the orbital parameters determined by radial velocity measurements made at the 8.2 m Subaru and 10 m Keck telescopes, the discovery announcement being made on September 14, 2006.

== Orbit and mass ==
HAT-P-1b is located in a very close orbit to its star, taking only 4.47 days to complete. It therefore falls into the category of hot Jupiters. At only 8.27 million kilometers from the star, tidal forces would circularise the orbit unless another perturbing body exists in the system. At the present time, the existing measurements are not sufficient to determine the orbital eccentricity, so a perfectly circular orbit has been assumed by the discoverers. However, the eccentricity of the planet was calculated to be no greater than 0.067.

In order to determine the mass of the planet, measurements of the star's radial velocity variations were made by the N2K Consortium. This was done by observing the Doppler shift in the star's spectrum. Combined with the known inclination of the orbit as determined by the transit observations, this revealed the mass of the planet to be 0.53 ± 0.04 times that of Jupiter.

== Rotation ==
As of August 2008, the most recent calculation of HAT-P-1b's Rossiter–McLaughlin effect and so spin-orbit angle was 3.7±2.1°.

== Characteristics ==
As evidenced by its high mass and planetary radius, HAT-P-1b is a gas giant, most likely composed primarily of hydrogen and helium. The emission from C_{2}, CN and CH radicals in planetary atmosphere was detected in 2022. The planetary atmosphere is hazy rather than cloudy, with observed clouds area fraction 22^{+5}_{−3} percent.

Current theories predict that such planets formed in the outer regions of their solar systems and migrated inwards to their present orbits.

HAT-P-1b is significantly larger than predicted by theoretical models. This may indicate the presence of an additional source of heat within the planet. One possible candidate is tidal heating from an eccentric orbit, a possibility which has not been ruled out from the available measurements. However, another planet with a significantly inflated radius, HD 209458 b, is in a circular orbit.

An alternative possibility is that the planet has a high axial tilt, like Uranus in the Solar System. The problem with this explanation is that it is thought to be quite difficult to get a planet into this configuration, so having two such planets among the set of known transiting planets is problematic.

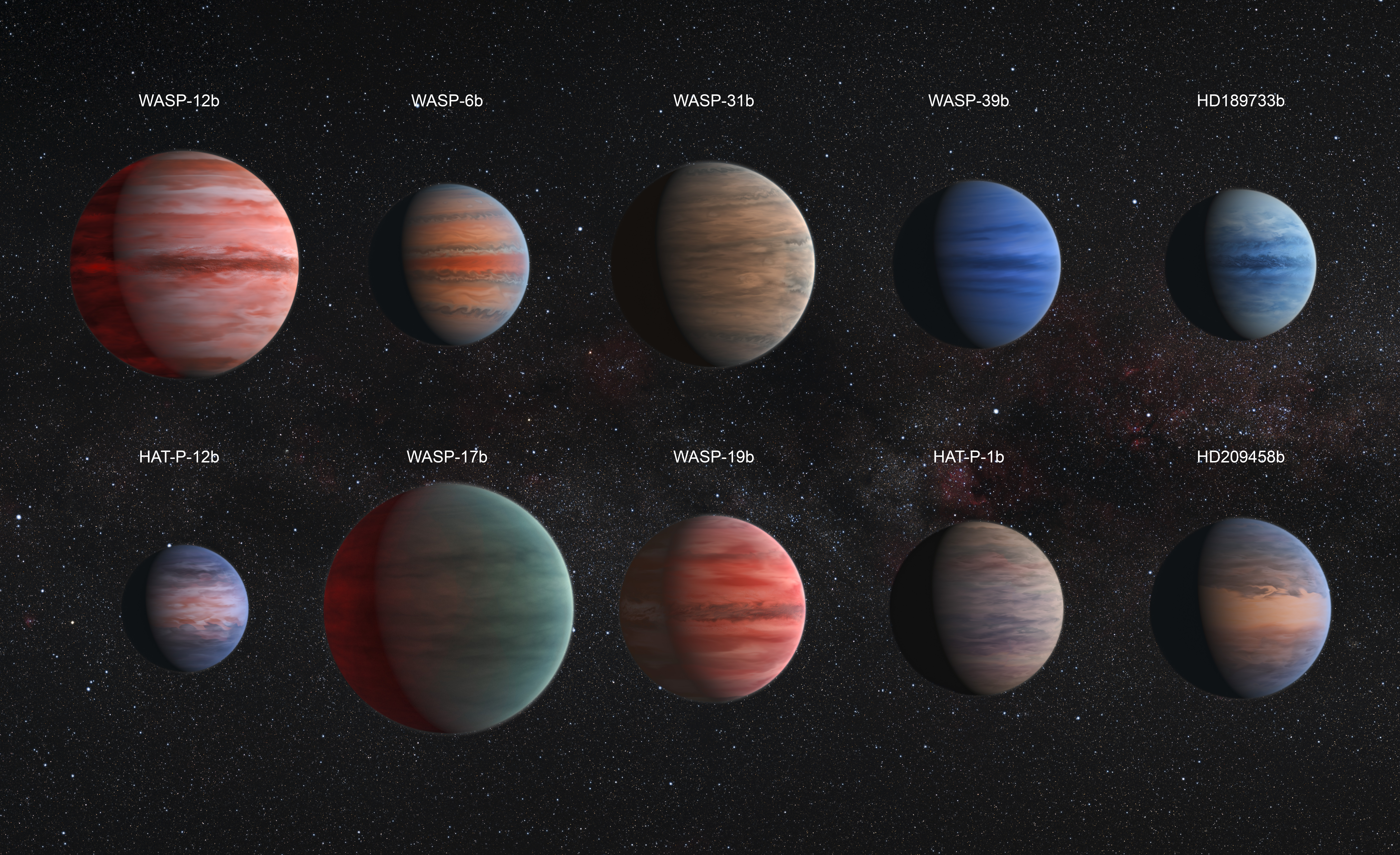
Comparison of "hot Jupiter" exoplanets (artist concept) From top left to lower right: WASP-12b, WASP-6b, WASP-31b, WASP-39b, HD 189733b, HAT-P-12b, WASP-17b, WASP-19b, HAT-P-1b and HD 209458b
