= WASP-31b =

Hot Jupiter orbiting the star WASP-31

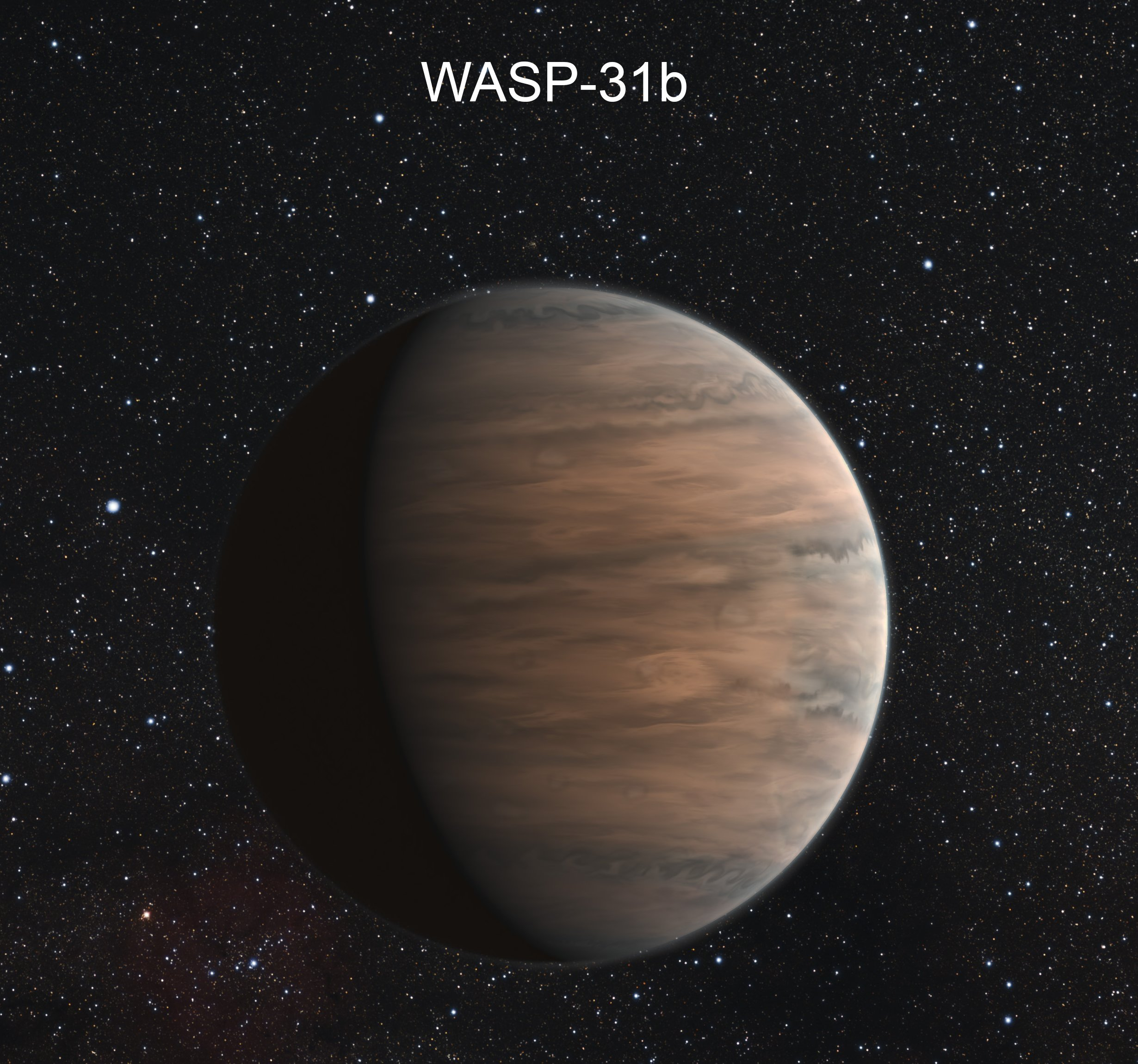
- "Hot Jupiter" exoplanet WASP-31b (artist concept)

Discovery
- Discovered by: Anderson, D.R. et al.
- Discovery site: WASP
- Discovery date: 2010
- Detection method: Primary transit

Orbital characteristics
- Semi-major axis: 0.04657±0.00034 AU
- Eccentricity: 0
- Orbital period (sidereal): 3.40591 d
- Inclination: 84.54±0.027
- Star: WASP-31

Physical characteristics
- Mean radius: 1.537±0.06 R_{J}
- Mass: 0.478±0.03 M_{J}

WASP-31b is a low-density (puffy) "hot Jupiter" extrasolar planet orbiting the metal-poor (63% of solar metallicity) dwarf star WASP-31. The exoplanet was discovered in 2010 by the WASP project. WASP-31b is in the constellation of Crater, and is about 1305 light-years (light travel distance) from Earth.

== Characteristics ==
WASP-31b is a low-density (puffy) "hot Jupiter" exoplanet with a mass about 0.48 times that of Jupiter and a radius about 1.55 times that of Jupiter. The planetary atmosphere has indeed the largest scale height, equal to 1150km, among exoplanets with measurable atmospheres as at 2021.

The exoplanet orbits WASP-31, its host star, every 3.4 days.

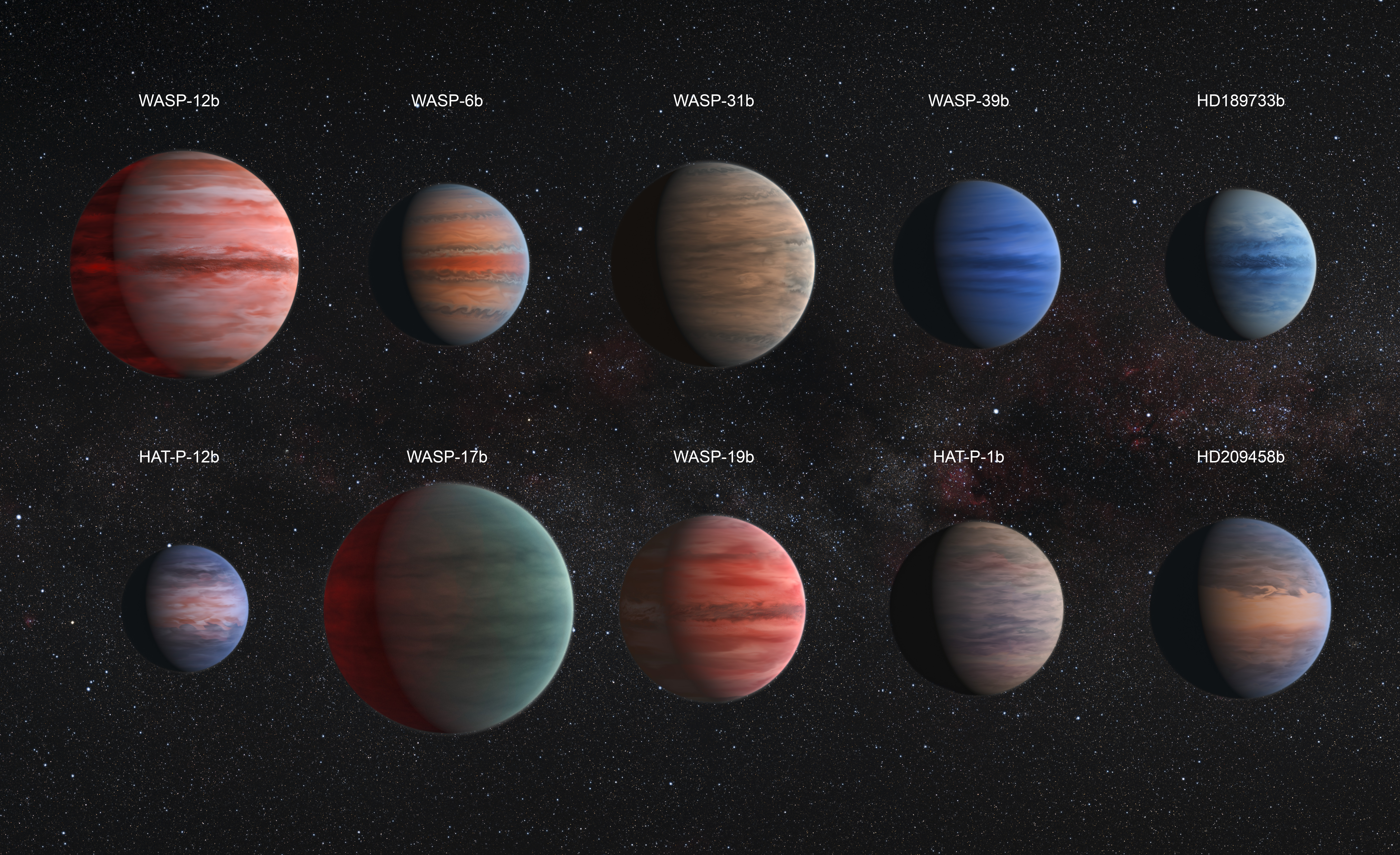
Comparison of "hot Jupiter" exoplanets, including WASP-31b (top row; 3rd from left) (artist concept) From top left to lower right: WASP-12b, WASP-6b, WASP-31b, WASP-39b, HD 189733b, HAT-P-12b, WASP-17b, WASP-19b, HAT-P-1b and HD 209458b.

In 2012, it was found from the Rossiter–McLaughlin effect that WASP-31b is orbiting the parent star in a prograde direction. The projected inclination of the WASP-31 star rotational axis relative to the planetary orbit is close to zero, with a value of −0.09^{+0.31}_{−0.32} degrees cited in a 2026 study. The spectroscopic study in 2014 revealed that WASP-31b has a dense cloud deck overlaid by a hazy atmosphere. WASP-31b was also reported to have significant amounts of potassium in its upper atmosphere, but the detection of potassium was refuted in 2015. The potassium detection discrepancy was resolved in 2020 with the improved cloud deck model, with the best fit being a very small amount of water over clouds and no potassium at all.

Reanalysis of planetary spectroscopic data in 2020 has revealed the presence of chromium monohydride besides water.

== See also ==
- WASP-6b
- WASP-12b
- WASP-17b
- WASP-19b
- WASP-39b
- WASP-121b
