= Hot Jupiter =

Gas giant planet orbiting close to a star

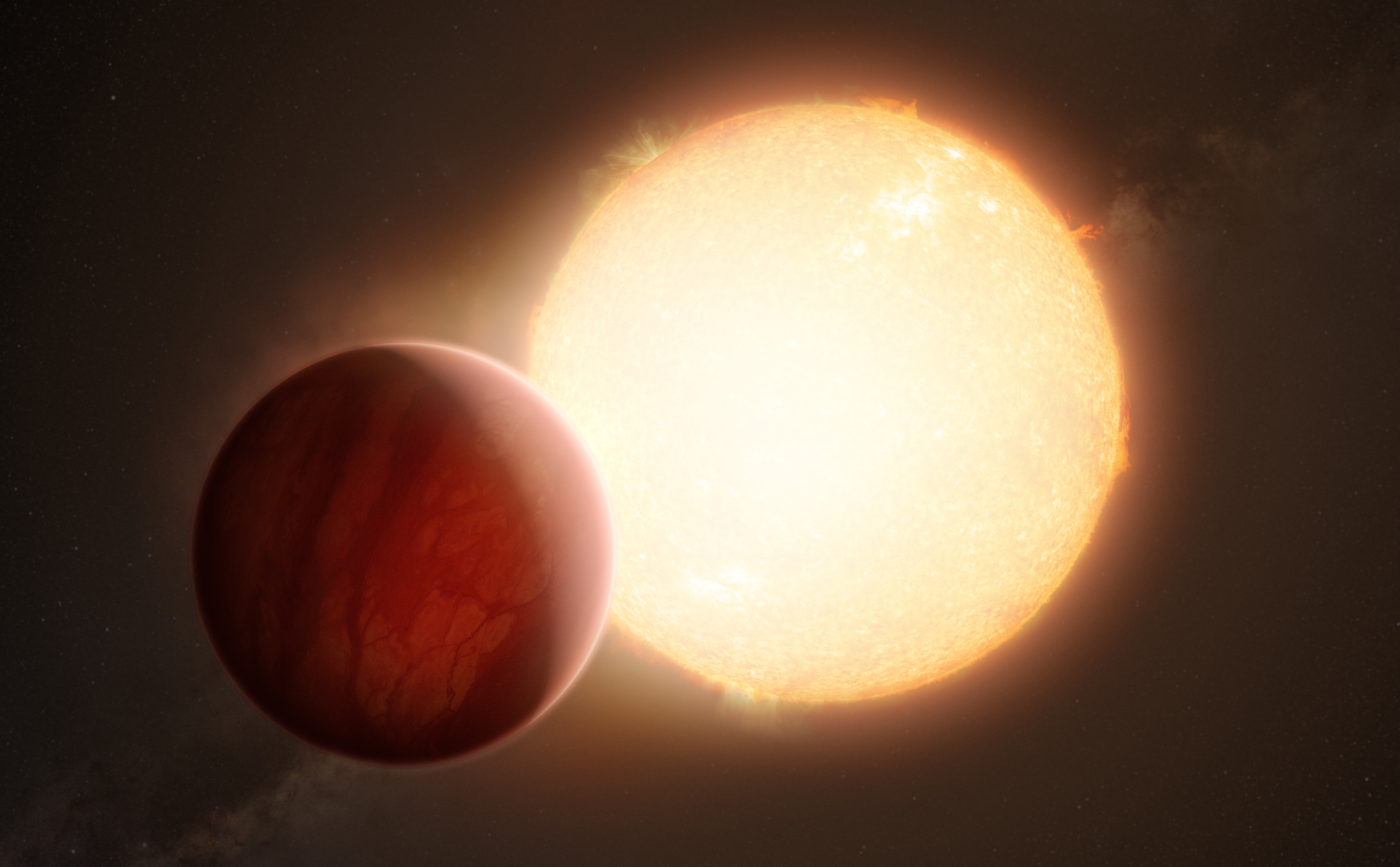
An artist's impression of a hot Jupiter orbiting close to its star

Hot Jupiters (sometimes called hot Saturns for less massive objects) are a class of gas giant exoplanets that are inferred to be physically similar to Jupiter (i.e. Jupiter analogues) but that have very short orbital periods (P < 10 days). The close proximity to their stars and high surface-atmosphere temperatures resulted in their informal name "hot Jupiters".

Hot Jupiters are the easiest extrasolar planets to detect via the radial-velocity method, because the oscillations they induce in their parent stars' motion are relatively large and rapid compared to those of other known types of planets. One of the best-known hot Jupiters is 51 Pegasi b. Discovered in 1995, it was the first extrasolar planet found orbiting a Sun-like star. 51 Pegasi b has an orbital period of about four days.

== General characteristics ==
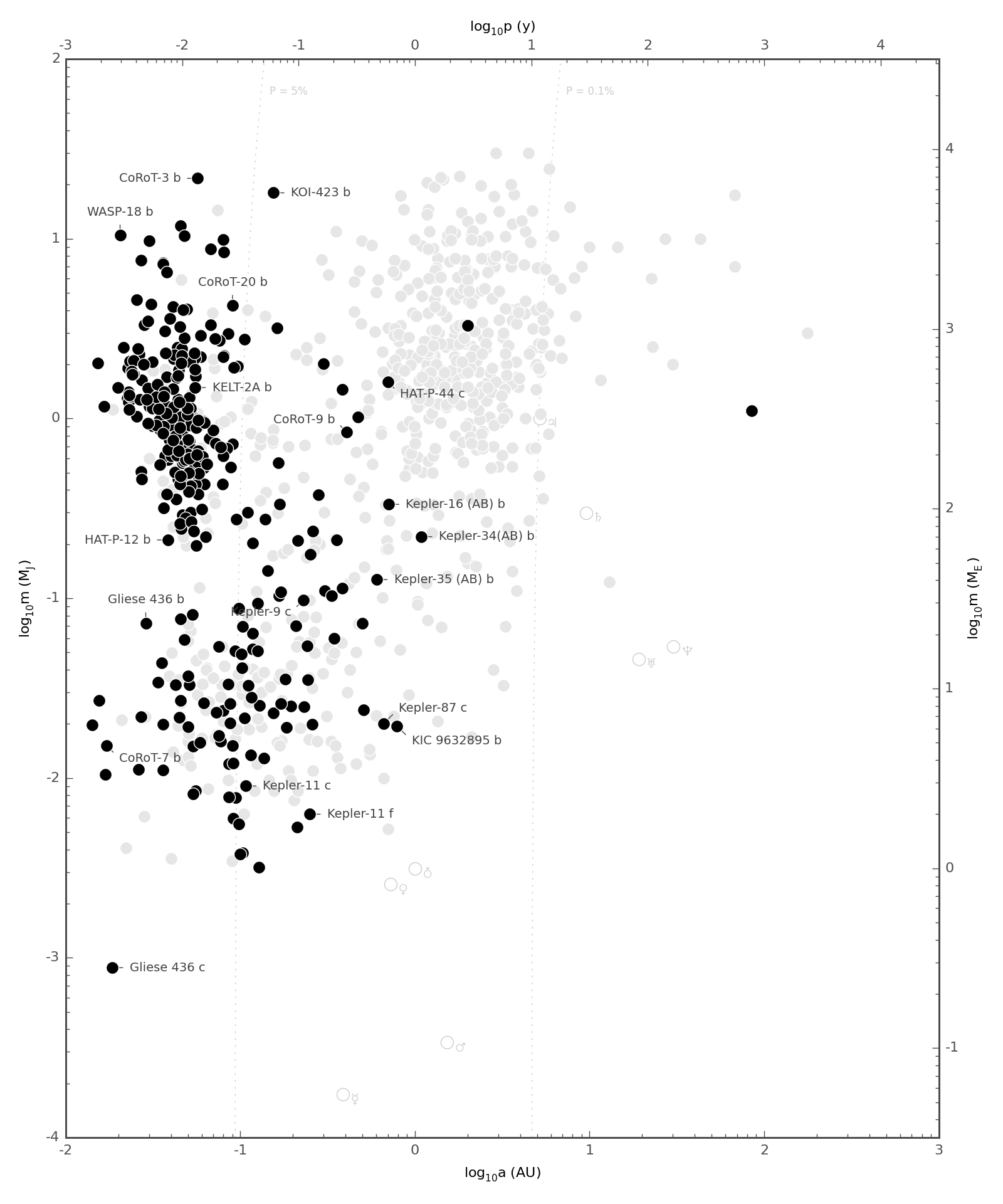
Hot Jupiters (along left edge, including most of planets detected using the transit method, indicated with black dots) discovered up to 2 January 2014

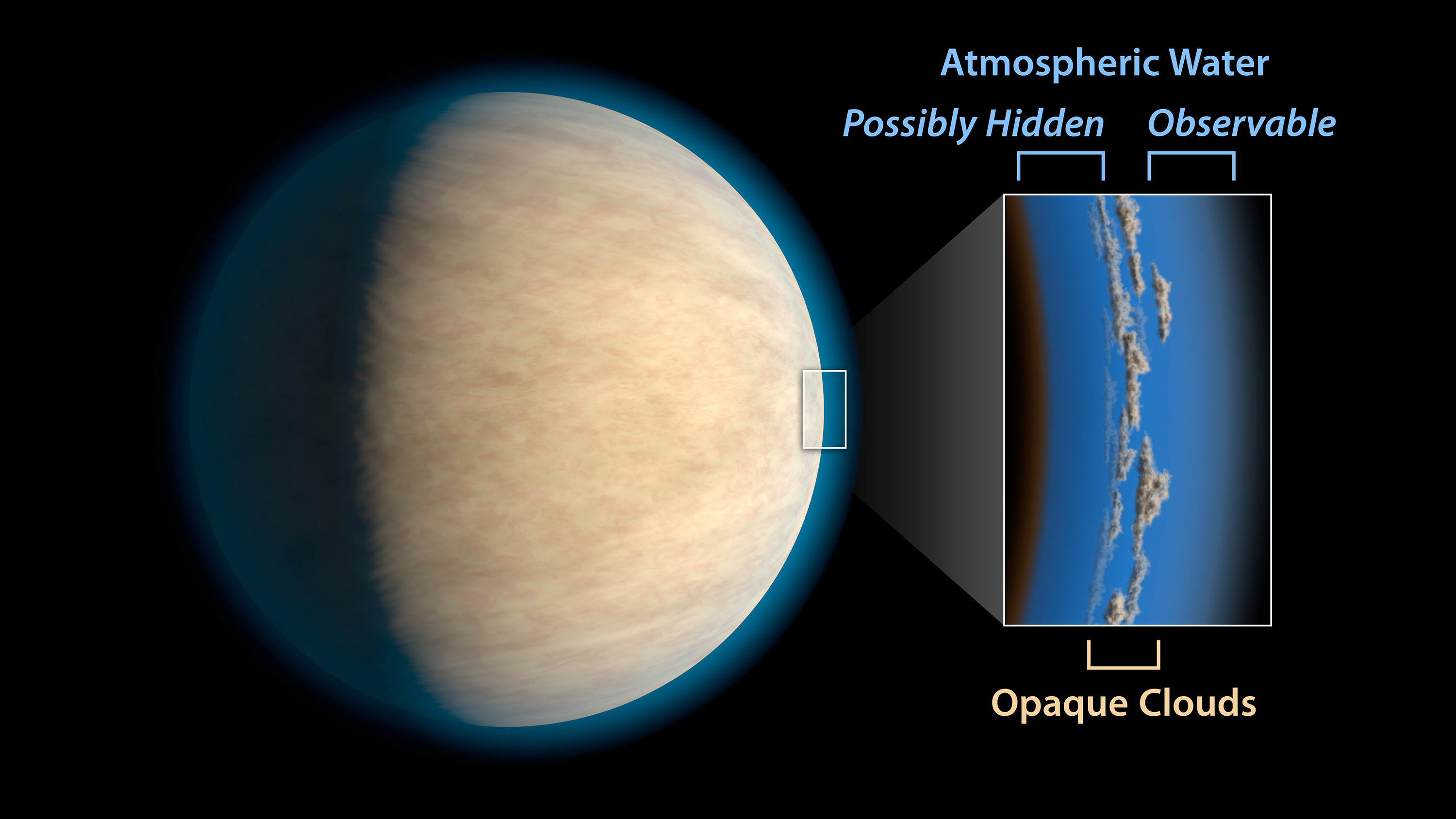
Hot Jupiter with hidden water

Though there is diversity among hot Jupiters, they do share some common properties.

- Their defining characteristics are their large masses and short orbital periods, spanning 0.36–11.8 Jupiter masses and 1.3–111 Earth days. The mass cannot be greater than approximately 13.6 Jupiter masses because then the pressure and temperature inside the planet would be high enough to cause deuterium fusion, and the planet would be a brown dwarf.
- Most have nearly circular orbits (low eccentricities). It is thought that their orbits are circularized by perturbations from nearby stars or tidal forces. Whether they remain in these circular orbits for long periods of time or collide with their host stars depends on the coupling of their orbital and physical evolution, which are related through the dissipation of energy and tidal deformation.
- Many have unusually low densities. The lowest one measured thus far is that of TrES-4b at 0.222 g/cm^{3}. The large radii of hot Jupiters are not yet fully understood but it is thought that the expanded envelopes can be attributed to high stellar irradiation, high atmospheric opacities, possible internal energy sources, and orbits close enough to their stars for the outer layers of the planets to exceed their Roche limit and be pulled further outward.
- Usually they are tidally locked, with one side always facing its host star.
- They are likely to have extreme and exotic atmospheres due to their short periods, relatively long days, and tidal locking.
- Atmospheric dynamics models predict strong vertical stratification with intense winds and super-rotating equatorial jets driven by radiative forcing and the transfer of heat and momentum. Recent models also predict a variety of storms (vortices) that can mix their atmospheres and transport hot and cold regions of gas.
- The day-night temperature difference at the photosphere is predicted to be substantial, approximately 500 K (500 °C; 900 °F) for a model based on HD 209458 b.
- They appear to be more common around F- and G-type stars and less so around K-type stars. Hot Jupiters around red dwarfs are very rare. Generalizations about the distribution of these planets must take into account the various observational biases, but in general their prevalence decreases exponentially as a function of the absolute stellar magnitude.

== Formation and evolution ==
There are three schools of thought regarding the possible origin of hot Jupiters. One possibility is that they were formed in situ at the distances at which they are currently observed. Another possibility is that they were formed at a distance but later migrated inward. Such a shift in position might occur due to interactions with gas and dust during the solar nebula phase. It might also occur as a result of a close encounter with another large object destabilizing a Jupiter's orbit.

=== Migration ===
In the migration hypothesis, a hot Jupiter forms beyond the frost line, from rock, ice, and gases via the core accretion method of planetary formation. The planet then migrates inwards to the star where it eventually forms a stable orbit. The planet may have migrated inward smoothly via type II orbital migration. Or it may have migrated more suddenly due to gravitational scattering onto eccentric orbits during an encounter with another massive planet, followed by the circularization and shrinking of the orbits due to tidal interactions with the star. A hot Jupiter's orbit could also have been altered via the Kozai mechanism (also called Lidov-Kozai mechanism) causing an exchange of inclination for eccentricity resulting in a high eccentricity low perihelion orbit, in combination with tidal friction. This requires a massive body—another planet or a stellar companion—on a more distant and inclined orbit; approximately 50% of hot Jupiters have distant Jupiter-mass or larger companions, which can leave the hot Jupiter with an orbit inclined relative to the star's rotation.

The type II migration happens during the solar nebula phase, i.e. when gas is still present. Energetic stellar photons and strong stellar winds at this time remove most of the remaining nebula. Migration via the other mechanism can happen after the loss of the gas disk.

=== In situ ===
Instead of being gas giants that migrated inward, in an alternate hypothesis the cores of the hot Jupiters began as more common super-Earths which accreted their gas envelopes at their current locations, becoming gas giants in situ. The super-Earths providing the cores in this hypothesis could have formed either in situ or at greater distances and have undergone migration before acquiring their gas envelopes. Since super-Earths are often found with companions, the hot Jupiters formed in situ could also be expected to have companions. The increase of the mass of the locally growing hot Jupiter has a number of possible effects on neighboring planets. If the hot Jupiter maintains an eccentricity greater than 0.01, sweeping secular resonances can increase the eccentricity of a companion planet, causing it to collide with the hot Jupiter. The core of the hot Jupiter in this case would be unusually large. If the hot Jupiter's eccentricity remains small the sweeping secular resonances could also tilt the orbit of the companion. Traditionally, the in situ mode of conglomeration has been disfavored because the assembly of massive cores, which is necessary for the formation of hot Jupiters, requires surface densities of solids ≈ 10^{4} g/cm^{2}, or larger. Recent surveys, however, have found that the inner regions of planetary systems are frequently occupied by super-Earth type planets. If these super-Earths formed at greater distances and migrated closer, the formation of in situ hot Jupiters is not entirely in situ.

=== Atmospheric loss ===
If the atmosphere of a hot Jupiter is stripped away via hydrodynamic escape, its core may become a chthonian planet. The amount of gas removed from the outermost layers depends on the planet's size, the gases forming the envelope, the orbital distance from the star, and the star's luminosity. In a typical system, a gas giant orbiting at 0.02 AU around its parent star loses 5–7% of its mass during its lifetime, but orbiting closer than 0.015 AU can mean evaporation of a substantially larger fraction of the planet's mass. No such objects have been found yet and they are still hypothetical.

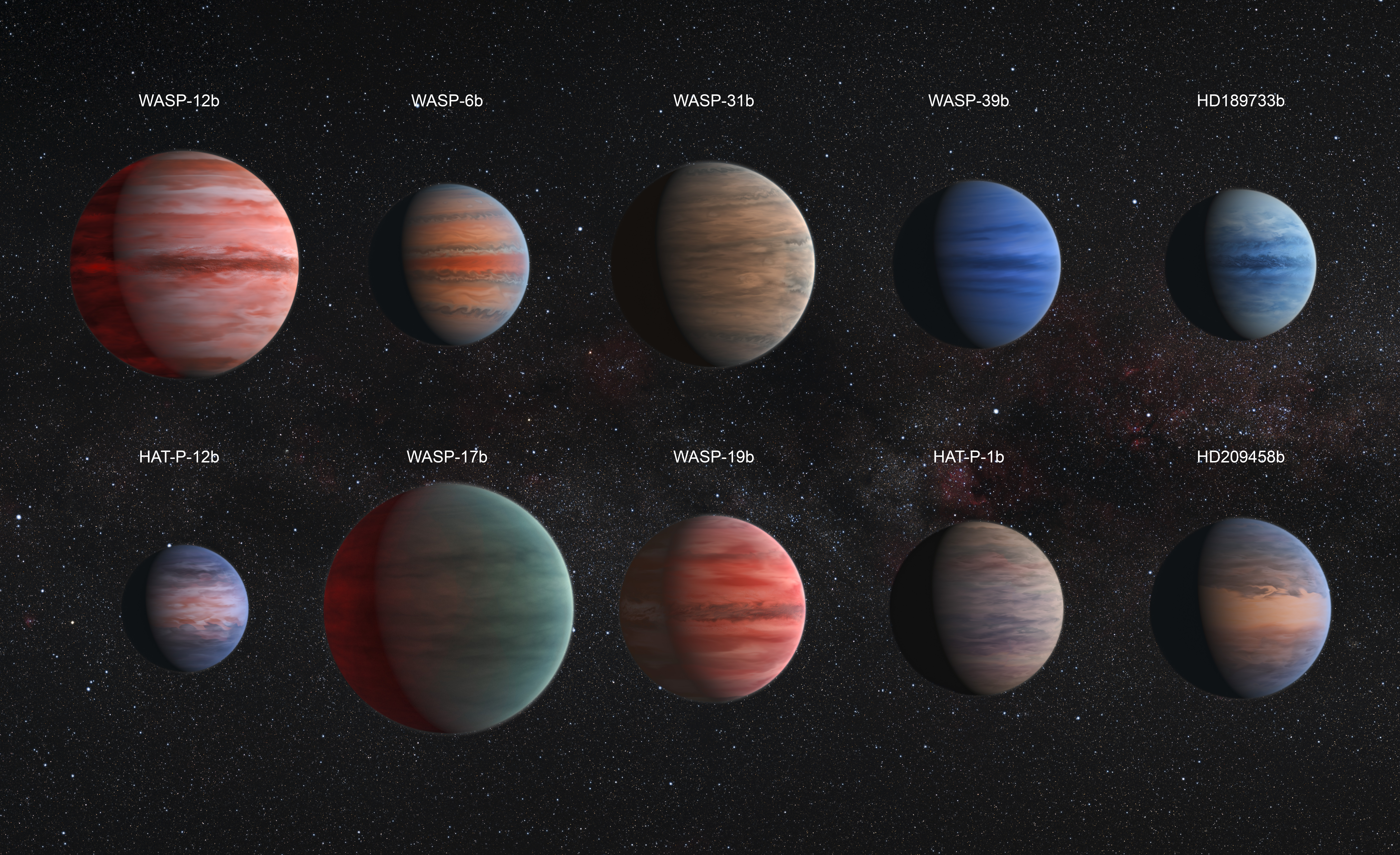
Comparison of "hot Jupiter" exoplanets (artist concept). From top left to lower right: WASP-12b, Boinayel, WASP-31b, Bocaprins, HD 189733b, Puli, Ditsö̀, Banksia, HAT-P-1b and HD 209458b

=== 3-day pile-up ===
If you plot all Hot-Jupiters on a line representing orbital period there is a pile-up of Jupiter-size planets in orbits with a 3 day period.

== Terrestrial planets in systems with hot Jupiters ==
Simulations have shown that the migration of a Jupiter-sized planet through the inner protoplanetary disk (the region between 5 and 0.1 AU from the star) is not as destructive as expected. More than 60% of the solid disk materials in that region are scattered outward, including planetesimals and protoplanets, allowing the planet-forming disk to reform in the gas giant's wake. In the simulation, planets up to two Earth masses were able to form in the habitable zone after the hot Jupiter passed through and its orbit stabilized at 0.1 AU. Due to the mixing of inner-planetary-system material with outer-planetary-system material from beyond the frost line, simulations indicated that the terrestrial planets that formed after a hot Jupiter's passage would be particularly water-rich. According to a 2011 study, hot Jupiters may become disrupted planets while migrating inwards; this could explain an abundance of "hot" Earth-sized to Neptune-sized planets within 0.2 AU of their host star.

One example of these sorts of systems is that of WASP-47. There are three inner planets and an outer gas giant in the habitable zone. The innermost planet, WASP-47e, is a large terrestrial planet of 6.83 Earth masses and 1.8 Earth radii; the hot Jupiter, b, is little heavier than Jupiter, but about 12.63 Earth radii; a final hot Neptune, c, is 15.2 Earth masses and 3.6 Earth radii. A similar orbital architecture is also exhibited by the Kepler-30 system.

== Misaligned orbits ==
Several hot Jupiters, such as HD 80606 b, have orbits that are misaligned with their host stars, including several with retrograde orbits such as HAT-P-14b. This misalignment may be related to the heat of the photosphere the hot Jupiter is orbiting. There are several proposed hypotheses as to why this might occur. One such hypothesis involves tidal dissipation and suggests there is a single mechanism for producing hot Jupiters and this mechanism yields a range of obliquities. Cooler stars with higher tidal dissipation damps the obliquity (explaining why hot Jupiters orbiting cooler stars are well aligned) while hotter stars do not damp the obliquity (explaining the observed misalignment). Another hypothesis is that the host star sometimes changes rotation early in its evolution, rather than the orbit changing. Yet another hypothesis is that hot Jupiters tend to form in dense clusters, where perturbations are more common and gravitational capture of planets by neighboring stars is possible.

== Ultra-hot Jupiters ==
Ultra-hot Jupiters are hot Jupiters with a dayside temperature greater than 2,200 K (1,930 °C; 3,500 °F). In such dayside atmospheres, most molecules dissociate into their constituent atoms and circulate to the nightside where they recombine into molecules again.

One example is TOI-1431b, announced by the University of Southern Queensland in April 2021, which has an orbital period of just two and a half days. Its dayside temperature is 2,700 K (2,430 °C; 4,400 °F), making it hotter than 40% of stars in our galaxy. The nightside temperature is 2,600 K (2,330 °C; 4,220 °F).

== Ultra-short period planets ==
Ultra-short period planets (USP) are a class of planets with orbital periods below one day and occur only around stars of less than about 1.25 solar masses.

Confirmed transiting hot Jupiters that have orbital periods of less than one day include WASP-18b, WASP-19b, WASP-43b, WASP-103b, TOI-1937A b and TOI-2109b.

As of 2025, 12 known Jovian USP planets have been found.

== Puffy planets ==
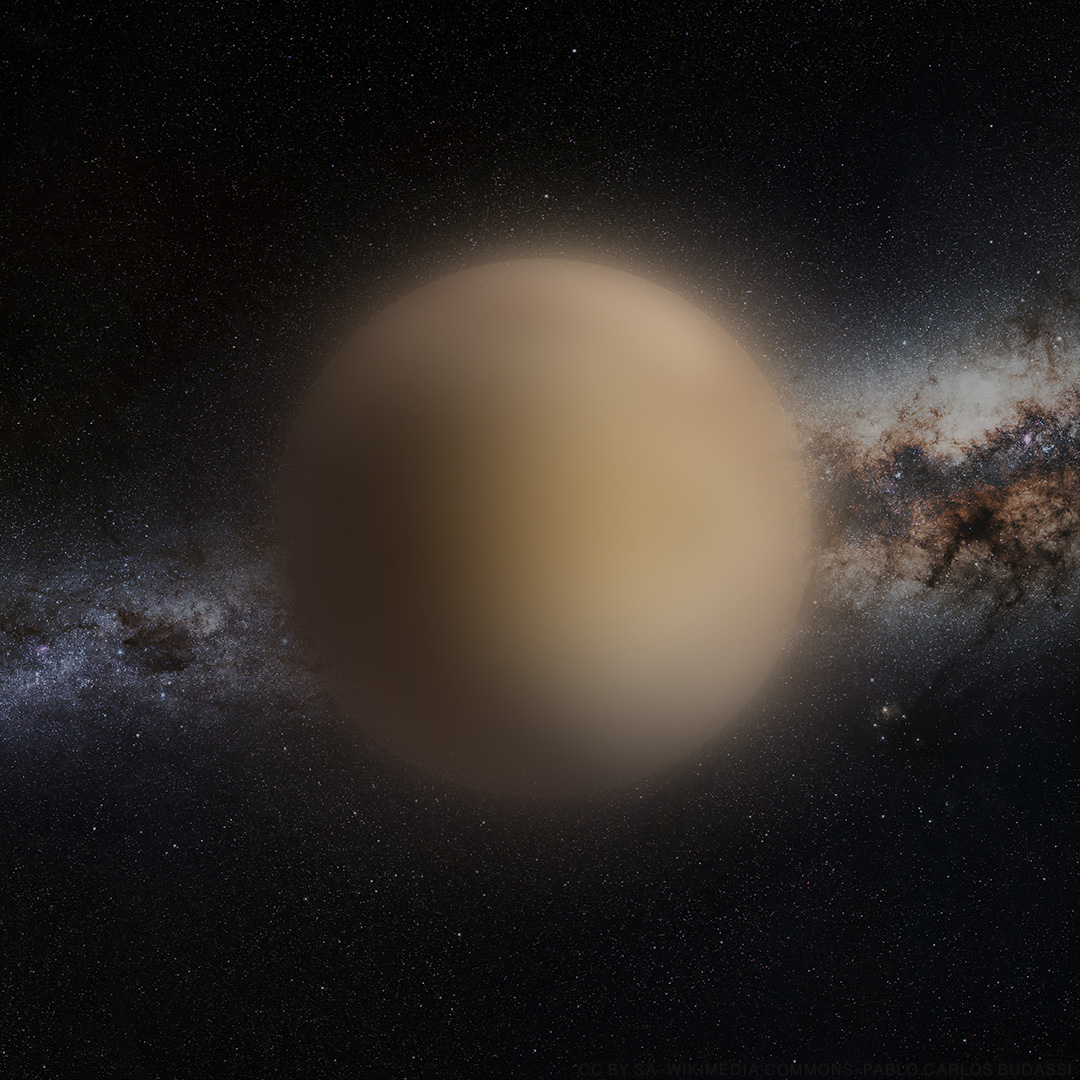
Artistic rendering of a puffy planet

Gas giants with a large radius and very low density are sometimes called "puffy planets" or "hot Saturns", due to their density being similar to Saturn's. Puffy planets orbit so close to their stars that their surface heat combined internal heating from their cores inflate their atmospheres. Six large-radius, low-density planets have been detected with the transit method: HAT-P-1b, CoRoT-1b, TrES-4b, WASP-12b, WASP-17b, and Kepler-7b. Some hot Jupiters detected by their radial-velocity may be puffy planets. Most of these planets are around or below Jupiter's mass, as more mass would give them stronger gravity and compress them to roughly Jupiter's size. Gas giants less massive than Jupiter with temperatures above 1,800 K (1,530 °C; 2,780 °F) are so light that they risk Roche-Lobe overflow and the complete evaporation of their atmosphere.

Even with surface heating from their star, many transiting hot Jupiters have more volume than expected. This could be caused by interaction between atmospheric winds and the planet's magnetosphere creating an electric current through the planet that heats it up, causing it to expand. A hotter planet had greater atmospheric ionization and thus greater magnitude of the interaction and electric current, creating more heat and expanding the planet. This theory matches the observation that planetary temperature is correlated with inflated planetary radii.

== Moons ==
Theoretical research suggests that hot Jupiters are unlikely to have moons, due to both a small Hill sphere and the tidal forces of the stars they orbit, which would destabilize any satellite's orbit, the latter process being stronger for larger moons. This means that for most hot Jupiters, stable satellites would be small asteroid-sized bodies. Furthermore, the physical evolution of hot Jupiters can determine the final fate of their moons: stall them in semi-asymptotic semimajor axes, or eject them from the system where they may undergo other unknown processes. In spite of this, observations of WASP-12b suggest that it is orbited by at least one large exomoon.

== Hot Jupiters around red giants ==
It has been proposed that gas giants orbiting red giants at distances similar to that of Jupiter could be hot Jupiters due to the intense irradiation they would receive from their stars. It is very likely that in the Solar System Jupiter will become a hot Jupiter after the transformation of the Sun into a red giant. The recent discovery of particularly low-density gas giants orbiting red giant stars supports this hypothesis.

Hot Jupiters orbiting red giants would differ from those orbiting main-sequence stars in a number of ways, most notably the possibility of accreting material from the stellar winds of their stars and, assuming a fast rotation (not tidally locked to their stars), a much more evenly distributed heat with many narrow-banded jets. Their detection using the transit method would be much more difficult due to their tiny size compared to the stars they orbit, as well as the long time needed (months or even years) for one to transit their star as well as to be occulted by it.

== Star–planet interactions ==
Theoretical research since 2000 suggested that "hot Jupiters" may cause increased flaring due to the interaction of the magnetic fields of the star and its orbiting exoplanet, or because of tidal forces between them. These effects are called "star–planet interactions" or SPIs. The HD 189733 system is the best-studied exoplanet system where this effect was thought to occur.

In 2008, a team of astronomers first described how as the exoplanet orbiting HD 189733 A reaches a certain place in its orbit, it causes increased stellar flaring. In 2010, a different team found that every time they observe the exoplanet at a certain position in its orbit, they also detected X-ray flares. In 2019, astronomers analyzed data from Arecibo Observatory, MOST, and the Automated Photoelectric Telescope, in addition to historical observations of the star at radio, optical, ultraviolet, and X-ray wavelengths to examine these claims. They found that the previous claims were exaggerated and the host star failed to display many of the brightness and spectral characteristics associated with stellar flaring and solar active regions, including sunspots. Their statistical analysis also found that many stellar flares are seen regardless of the position of the exoplanet, therefore debunking the earlier claims. The magnetic fields of the host star and exoplanet do not interact, and this system is no longer believed to have a "star-planet interaction." Some researchers had also suggested that HD 189733 accretes, or pulls, material from its orbiting exoplanet at a rate similar to those found around young protostars in T Tauri star systems. Later analysis demonstrated that very little, if any, gas was accreted from the "hot Jupiter" companion.

== See also ==
- Grand tack hypothesis – a model that posits that Jupiter migrated inwards through the early Solar System, before being pulled to its present location as a result of orbital resonance with Saturn
- Hot Neptune – Large planet orbiting close to a star
- Jupiter analogue – Exoplanets similar to Jupiter
- Lists of planets
- Planetary migration
- Sub-brown dwarf – Astronomical objects of planetary size that did not form in orbit around a star
