= HD 149026 b =

Extrasolar planet in the constellation Hercules

HD 149026 b / Smertrios
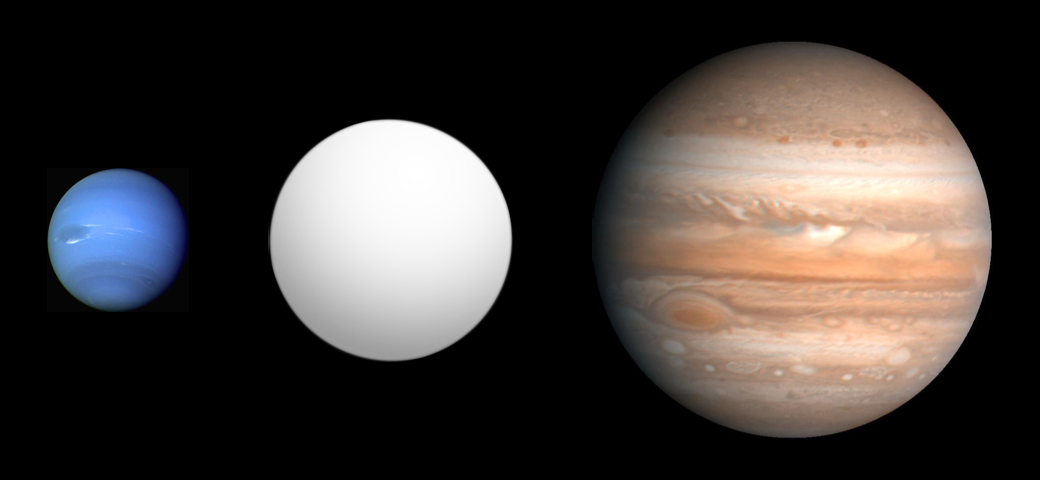
- Size comparison of Smertrios with Neptune and Jupiter

Discovery
- Discovered by: B. Sato, D. Fischer, G. Henry et al.
- Discovery site: W. M. Keck Observatory
- Discovery date: 1 July 2005
- Detection method: Radial velocity

Orbital characteristics
- Semi-major axis: 0.04364 ± 0.00022 AU (6,528,000 ± 33,000 km)
- Eccentricity: <0.013
- Orbital period (sidereal): 2.87588874 ± 5.9×10^{−7} d
- Inclination: 84.50°+0.60° −0.52°
- Semi-amplitude: 37.9+1.8 −1.3 m/s
- Star: HD 149026

Physical characteristics
- Mean radius: 0.811+0.029 −0.027 R_{J}
- Mass: 0.322+0.014 −0.012 M_{J}
- Mean density: 0.750+0.089 −0.077 g/cm^{3}
- Albedo: 0.53+0.09 −0.11 (Bond)
- Temperature: 1,804±98 K (1,531 °C; 2,788 °F, dayside); 1,032±120 K (759 °C; 1,398 °F, nightside)

HD 149026 b, also known as Smertrios /ˈsmɜːrtriɒs/, is an exoplanet, specifically a hot Jupiter, approximately 250 light-years from the Sun in the constellation of Hercules. Its host star is HD 149026, also named Ogma /ˈɒɡmə/.

The planet orbits the yellow subgiant star HD 149026 with a 2.8766-day period at a distance of 0.042 AU (3.9 million mi; 6.3 million km), and is notable first as a transiting planet, and second for a small measured radius (relative to mass and incoming heat) that suggests an exceptionally large planetary core. As its star is evolved to such a stage and the planet is so close, the planet is likely to be destroyed during its imminent red giant stage in the next few hundred million years.

== Name ==
Following its discovery in 2005 the planet was designated HD 149026 b. In July 2014, the International Astronomical Union launched NameExoWorlds, a process for giving proper names to certain exoplanets and their host stars. The process involved public nomination and voting for the new names. In December 2015, the IAU announced the winning name was Smertrios for this planet. The winning name was submitted by the Club d'Astronomie de Toussaint of France. Smertrios was a Gallic deity of war.

== Discovery ==
The planet was discovered by the N2K Consortium in 2005, which searches stars for closely orbiting giant planets similar to 51 Pegasi b using the highly successful radial velocity method. The spectrum of the star was studied from the Keck and Subaru Telescopes. After the planet was first detected from the Doppler effect it caused in the light of the host star, it was studied for transits at the Fairborn Observatory. A tiny decrease of light (0.003 magnitudes) was detected every time the planet was transiting the star, thus confirming its existence.

Although the change of brightness caused by the transiting planet is tiny, it is detectable by amateur astronomers, providing an opportunity for amateurs to make important astronomical contributions. Indeed, one amateur astronomer, Ron Bissinger, actually detected a partial transit a day before the discovery was published.

== Orbit ==
The planet's orbit is probably circular (within one standard deviation of error).

Careful radial velocity measurements have made it possible to detect the Rossiter–McLaughlin effect, the shifting in photospheric spectral lines caused by the planet occulting a part of the rotating stellar surface. This effect allows the measurement of the angle between the planet's orbital plane and the equatorial plane of the star. In the case of HD 149026 b, the alignment was measured to be +11±14°. This in turn suggests that the formation of the planet was peaceful and probably involved interactions with the protoplanetary disc. A much larger angle would have suggested a violent interplay with other protoplanets. A study in 2012 refined the spin-orbit angle to 12±7°.

== Physical characteristics ==
The planet orbits the star in a so-called "torch orbit". One revolution around the star takes only a little less than three Earth days to complete. The planet is less massive than Jupiter (0.36 times Jupiter's mass, or 114 times Earth's mass) but more massive than Saturn. The temperature of the planet was initially estimated on the basis of an assumed 0.3 Bond albedo to be about 1,540 K (2,310 °F; 1,270 °C), above the predicted temperature of HD 209458 b (1,400 K (2,100 °F; 1,100 °C)), which had inaugurated the category of Chthonian "hell planet". Its day-side brightness temperature was subsequently directly measured as 2,300 ± 200 K by comparing the combined emissions of star and planet at 8 μm wavelength before and during a transit event. This is well above the melting point of iron.

The initial albedo estimate of 0.3 had come from averaging Sudarsky's theoretical classes IV and V. The planet's extremely high temperature had forced astronomers to abandon that estimate; in 2007, they predicted that the planet must absorb most of the starlight that falls on it — that is, near zero albedo like HD 209458 b. Subsequent studies have not confirmed this, with a 2018 study finding a high Bond albedo of 0.53, along with a dayside temperature of 1804±98 K, cooler than the 2007 estimate.

Between that and the hot, high-pressure gas surrounding the core, a stratosphere of cooler gas was once predicted but has not been observed. The atmosphere is likely high in carbon monoxide and dioxide.

The outer shell of dark, opaque, hot clouds are usually thought to be vanadium oxide and titanium oxide ("pM planets"), but spectral measurement in 2021 has revealed a neutral titanium and iron instead, implying the planet may be oxygen-poor and carbon-rich.

The planet-star radius ratio is 0.05158 ± 0.00077. Currently what limits more precision on HD 149026 b's radius "is the uncertainty in the stellar radius", and measurement of the stellar radius is distorted by pollution on the star's surface.

Even allowing for uncertainty the radius of HD 149026 b is only about three quarters that of Jupiter (or 83% that of Saturn). HD 149026 b was the first of its kind: HD 149026 b's low volume means that the planet is too dense for a Saturn-like gas giant of its mass and temperature.

It may have an exceptionally large core composed of "metals", or elements heavier than hydrogen and helium: the initial theoretical models gave the core a mass of 70 times Earth's mass; further refinements suggest 80–110 Earth masses. As a result, the planet has been described as a "super-Neptune", in analogy to the core-dominated outer ice giants of the Solar System, though whether the core of HD 149026 b is mainly icy or rocky is not currently known. Robert Naeye in Sky & Telescope claimed "it contains as much or more metals than all the planets and asteroids in our solar system combined". In addition to uncertainties of radius, its tidal heating over its history needs be taken into account; if its current orbit is circular and if that had evolved from a more eccentric one, the extra heat increases its expected radius per its model and thereby its core radius.

Naeye further speculated that the gravity could be as high as ten g (ten times gravity on Earth's surface) on the surface of the core.

== Theoretical consequences ==
The discovery was advocated as a piece of evidence for the popular solar nebula accretion model, where planets are formed from the accretion of smaller objects. In this model, giant planet embryos grow large enough to acquire large envelopes of hydrogen and helium. However, opponents of this model emphasize that only one example of such a dense planet is not proof. In fact, such a huge core is difficult to explain even by the core accretion model.

One possibility is that because the planet orbits so close to its star, it is — unlike Jupiter — ineffective in cleansing the planetary system of rocky bodies. Instead, a heavy rain of heavier elements on the planet may have helped create the large core.

== See also ==
- HAT-P-3b
- HD 209458 b
- HD 179949 b
- Tau Boötis b
