= HD 209458 =

F-type or G-type star in the constellation Pegasus

- HD 209458 (100x100) Location of HD 209458 in the constellation Pegasus

Observation data Epoch J2000 Equinox ICRS
- Constellation: Pegasus
- Right ascension: 22^{h} 03^{m} 10.77275^{s}
- Declination: +18° 53′ 03.5494″
- Apparent magnitude (V): 7.65

Characteristics
- Evolutionary stage: main sequence
- Spectral type: F9 V or G0 V
- Apparent magnitude (B): 8.244
- Apparent magnitude (K): 6.308±0.026
- B−V color index: +0.574±0.014
- Variable type: EP

Astrometry
Radial velocity (R_{v})	−14.78±0.16 km/s
Proper motion (μ)	RA: 29.766(28) mas/yr Dec.: −17.976(25) mas/yr
Parallax (π)	20.7694±0.0266 mas
Distance	157.0 ± 0.2 ly (48.15 ± 0.06 pc)
Absolute magnitude (M_{V})	4.28±0.10

Details
Mass	1.148±0.022 M_{☉}
Radius	1.203±0.061 R_{☉}
Luminosity	1.77±0.14 L_{☉}
Surface gravity (log g)	4.38 cgs
Temperature	6,071±20 K
Metallicity [Fe/H]	0.00±0.02 dex
Rotation	10.65±0.75 d
Rotational velocity (v sin i)	4.49±0.50 km/s
Age	3.5±1.4 Gyr

Other designations
- V376 Peg, BD+18°4917, HIP 108859, SAO 107623, 2MASS J22031077+1853036

Database references
SIMBAD	data
Exoplanet Archive	data

HD 209458 is a star with an orbiting exoplanet in the constellation Pegasus. It has an apparent visual magnitude of 7.65 and an absolute magnitude of 4.28. Because it is located at a distance of 157 light-years (48 parsecs) from the Sun as measured via parallax, it is not visible to the unaided eye. With good binoculars or a small telescope it should be easily detectable. The system is drifting closer with a heliocentric radial velocity of −14.8 km/s.

== Stellar properties ==
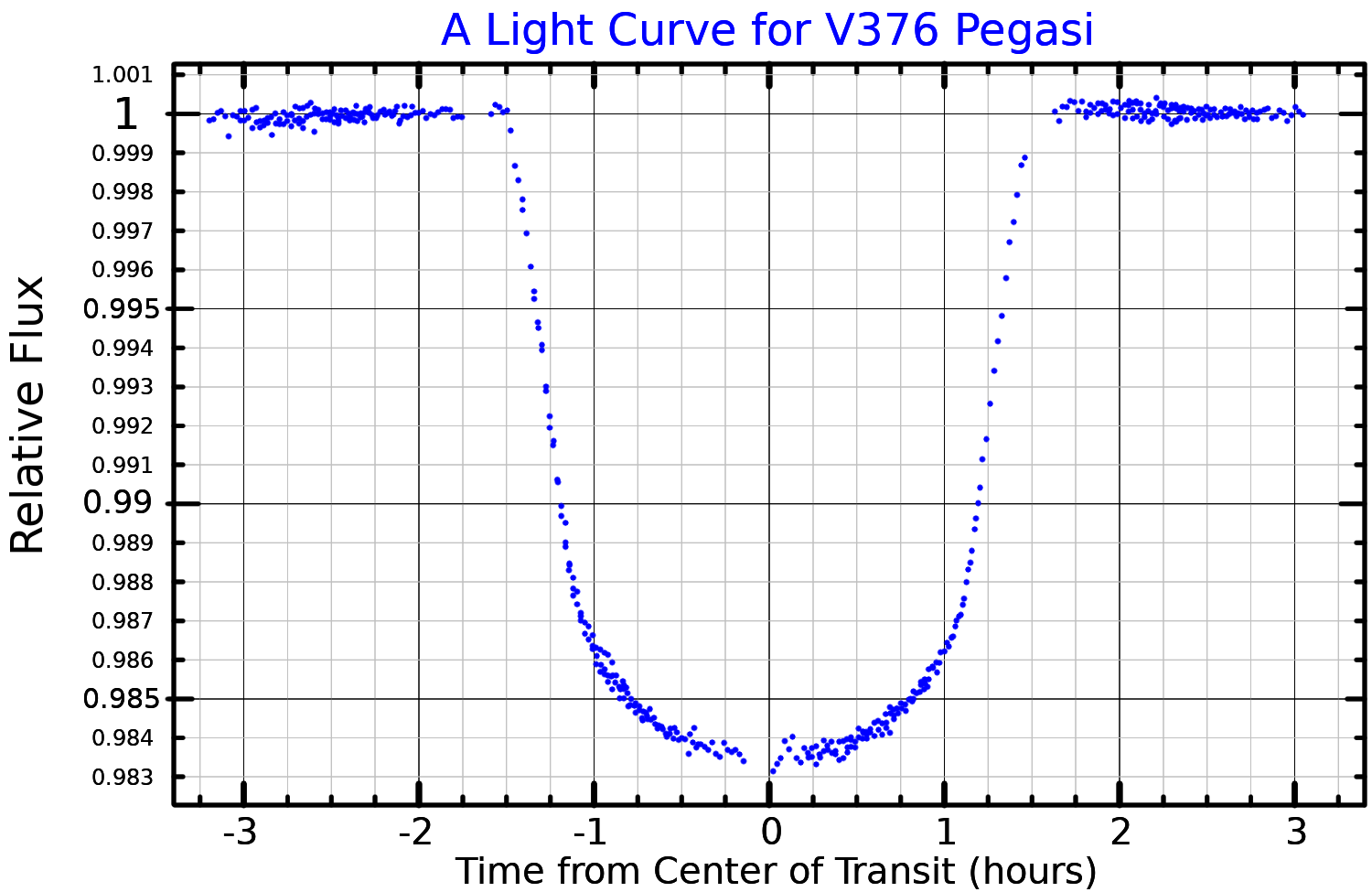
A light curve of planet HD 209458 b transiting the star, adapted from Brown et al. (2001)

The spectrum of HD 209458 presents as a late F- or early G-type main-sequence star with a stellar classification of F9 V or G0 V, respectively. It is roughly 3.5 billion years old and is spinning with a projected rotational velocity of 4.2 km/s. The star displays a moderate amount of magnetic activity in its chromosphere. It has a 15% greater mass than the Sun and a 20% larger radius. The abundance of iron, a measure of the metallicity of the star, is solar. HD 209458 is radiating 1.8 times the luminosity of the Sun from its photosphere at an effective temperature of 6,071 K.

Because the planet transits the star, the star is dimmed by about 2% every 3.5 days making it an extrinsic variable. The variable star designation for HD 209458 is V376 Pegasi. It is the prototype of the variable class "EP" in the General Catalogue of Variable Stars, defined as stars showing eclipses by their planets.

== Planetary system ==
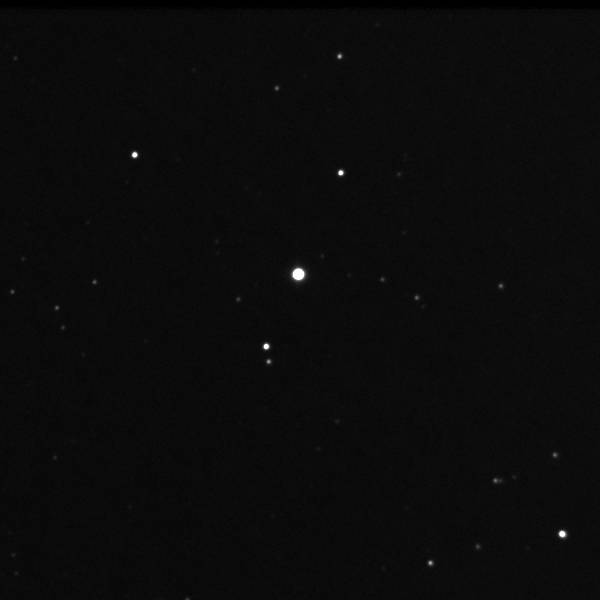
HD 209458 (north is towards top right)

In 1999, two teams working independently (one team consisted of astronomers at the Geneva Observatory, the Center for Astrophysics | Harvard & Smithsonian, and the Wise Observatory; the second group was the California and Carnegie Planet Search team) discovered an extrasolar planet orbiting the star by using the radial velocity planet search method. Soon after the discovery, separate teams led by David Charbonneau and Gregory W. Henry were able to detect a transit of the planet across the surface of the star making it the first known transiting extrasolar planet. The planet received the designation HD 209458 b.

The planet is now under even more public scrutiny with the announcement that its atmosphere contains water vapor. Astronomers had made careful photometric measurements of several stars known to be orbited by planets, in the hope that they might observe a dip in brightness caused by the transit of the planet across the star's face. This would require the planet's orbit to be inclined such that it would pass between the Earth and the star, and previously no transits had been detected.

Travis Barman at Lowell Observatory in Flagstaff, Arizona analyzed the emission spectrum of this planet in 2007, and believes that its atmosphere contains water vapor, although previous research in 2007 suggests that the atmosphere is composed mostly of silicate clouds. A spectrum taken in 2020 detected either sodium or titanium oxide in the planet's atmosphere. A later study in 2021 did not find any molecular absorption features in the planetary atmosphere at all.

The HD 209458 planetary system
Companion (in order from star)	Mass	Semimajor axis (AU)	Orbital period (days)	Eccentricity	Inclination (°)	Radius
b	0.682+0.014 −0.015 M_{J}	0.04707+0.00045 −0.00047	3.52474859(38)	<0.0081	86.71±0.05	1.359+0.016 −0.019 R_{J}

== See also ==
- List of exoplanets discovered before 2000
