= HD 209458 b =

Gas giant exoplanet orbiting HD 209458

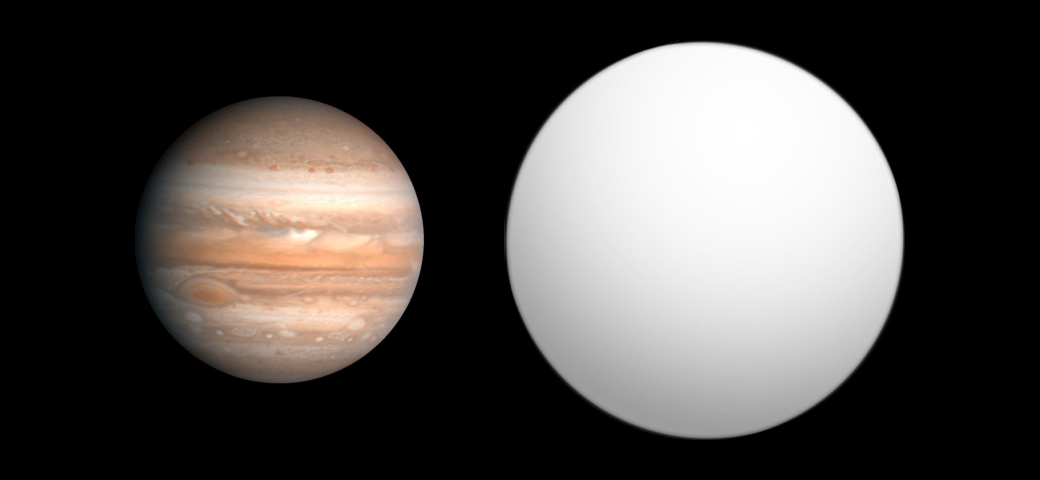
- Size comparison of HD 209458 b with Jupiter

Discovery
- Discovered by: D. Charbonneau; T. Brown; David Latham; M. Mayor; G.W. Henry; G. Marcy; R.P. Butler; S.S. Vogt
- Discovery site: High Altitude Observatory; Geneva Observatory
- Discovery date: September 9, 1999
- Detection method: Radial velocity

Orbital characteristics
- Semi-major axis: 0.04707 AU (7,042,000 km)
- Eccentricity: <0.0081
- Orbital period (sidereal): 3.52474859(38) d 84.59396616 h
- Inclination: 86.710°±0.050°
- Time of periastron: 2452826.629283(87) JD
- Argument of periastron: 83
- Semi-amplitude: 84.27+0.69 −0.70 m/s
- Star: HD 209458

Physical characteristics
- Mean radius: 1.359+0.016 −0.019 R_{J}
- Mass: 0.682+0.014 −0.015 M_{J}
- Mean density: 0.333+0.014 −0.013 g/cm^{3}
- Surface gravity: 9.2 m/s^{2} (0.94 g)
- Albedo: 0.096±0.016 (geometric)
- Temperature: 1499±15 K (1,226 °C; 2,239 °F, dayside); 972±44 K (699 °C; 1,290 °F, nightside)

HD 209458 b is an exoplanet, specifically a hot Jupiter, that orbits the solar analog HD 209458 in the constellation Pegasus, some 157 light-years (48 parsecs) from the Solar System. It is sometimes informally called Osiris. The radius of the planet's orbit is 0.047 AU (7.0 million km; 4.4 million mi), or one-eighth the radius of Mercury's orbit (0.39 AU (36 million mi; 58 million km)). This small orbital distance results in a year that is 3.5 Earth-days long and an estimated surface temperature of about 1,000 °C (1,800 °F; 1,300 K). Its mass is 220 times that of Earth (0.69 Jupiter masses) and its volume is some 2.5 times greater than that of Jupiter. The high mass and volume of HD 209458 b indicate that it is a gas giant.

HD 209458 b represents a number of milestones in exoplanetary research. It was the first of many categories:

- a transiting extrasolar planet
- The first planet detected through more than one method
- an extrasolar planet known to have an atmosphere
- an extrasolar planet observed to have an evaporating hydrogen atmosphere
- an extrasolar planet found to have an atmosphere containing the elements oxygen and carbon
- one of the first two extrasolar planets to be observed spectroscopically in emission
- The first extrasolar gas giant to have its superstorm measured
- the first planet to have its orbital speed measured, determining its mass directly.

Based on the application of newer theoretical models, as of April 2007, it is thought to be the first extrasolar planet found to have water vapor in its atmosphere.

== Nomenclature ==
The designation HD 209458 b indicates that this is the first planet to be discovered around the star HD 209458, as per exoplanet naming convention. The host star's designation comes from the Henry Draper Catalogue.

The planet has also been called "Osiris" after the Egyptian god. This name was first proposed in 2003 by A. Vidal-Madjar and A. Lecavelier des Etangs, who compared the planet's evaporating atmosphere to Osiris having lost part of his body in the myth of his death and resurrection. The name has subsequently seen some use by other astronomers, and has been acknowledged by the IAU, but as of 2025 it has not yet been approved as an official proper name.

== Detection and discovery ==
=== Transits ===
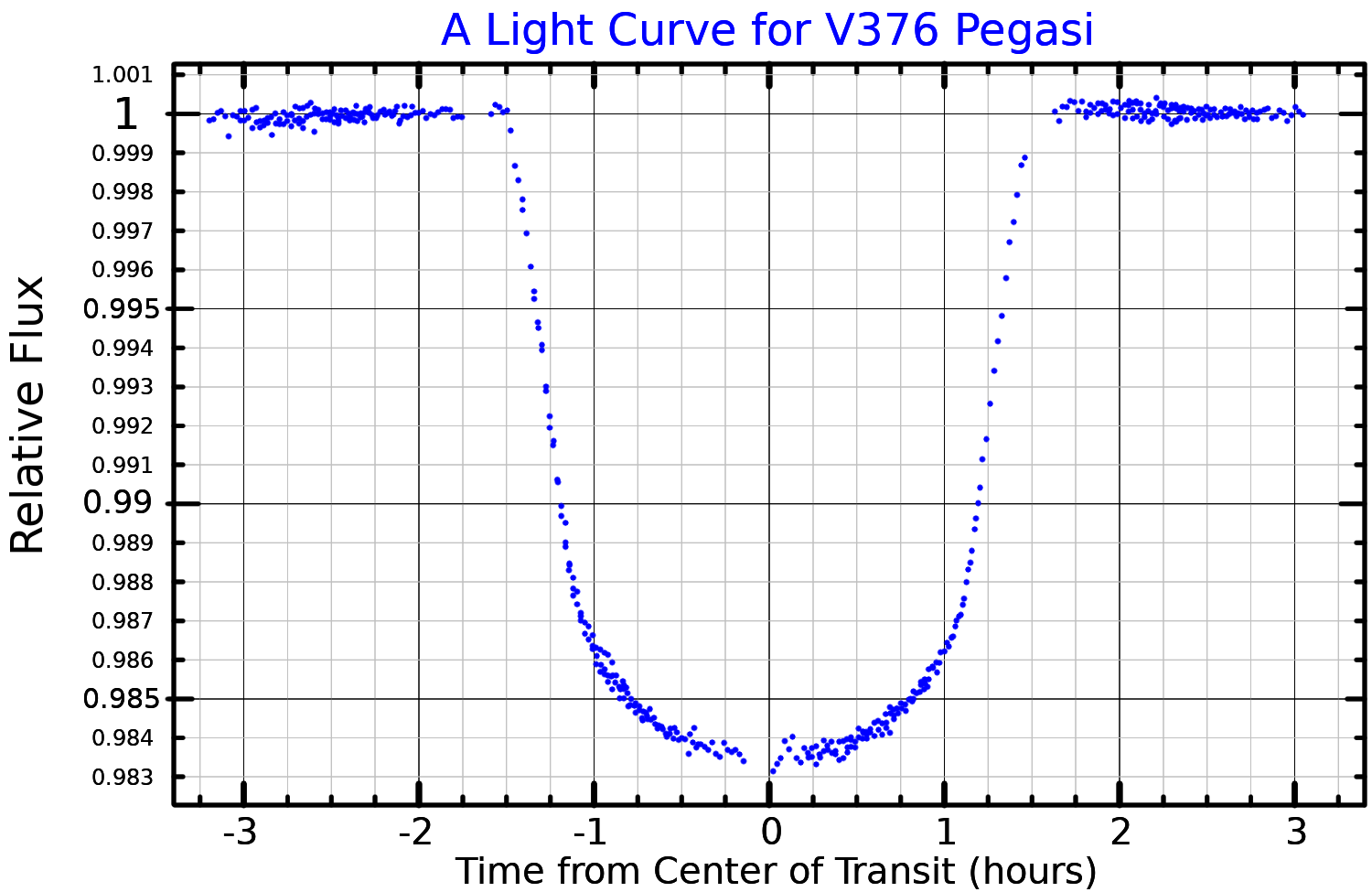
A light curve of planet HD 209458 b transiting the star, adapted from Brown et al. (2001)

Spectroscopic studies first revealed the presence of a planet around HD 209458 on November 5, 1999. Astronomers had made careful photometric measurements of several stars known to be orbited by planets, in the hope that they might observe a dip in brightness caused by the transit of the planet across the star's face. This would require the planet's orbit to be inclined such that it would pass between the Earth and the star, and previously no transits had been detected.

Soon after the discovery, separate teams, one led by David Charbonneau including Timothy Brown and others, and the other by Gregory W. Henry, were able to detect a transit of the planet across the surface of the star making it the first known transiting extrasolar planet. On September 9 and 16, 1999, Charbonneau's team measured a 1.7% drop in HD 209458's brightness, which was attributed to the passage of the planet across the star. On November 8, Henry's team observed a partial transit, seeing only the ingress. Initially unsure of their results, the Henry group decided to rush their results to publication after overhearing rumors that Charbonneau had successfully seen an entire transit in September. Papers from both teams were published simultaneously in the same issue of the Astrophysical Journal. Each transit lasts about three hours, during which the planet covers about 1.5% of the star's face.

The star had been observed many times by the Hipparcos satellite, which allowed astronomers to calculate the orbital period of HD 209458 b very accurately at 3.524736 days.

=== Spectroscopic ===
Spectroscopic analysis had shown that the planet had a mass about 0.69 times that of Jupiter. The occurrence of transits allowed astronomers to calculate the planet's radius, which had not been possible for any previously known exoplanet, and it turned out to have a radius some 35% larger than Jupiter's. It had been previously hypothesized that hot Jupiters particularly close to their parent star should exhibit this kind of inflation due to intense heating of their outer atmosphere. Tidal heating due to its orbit's eccentricity, which may have been more eccentric at formation, may also have played a role over the past billion years.

=== Direct detection ===
On March 22, 2005, NASA released news that infrared light from the planet had been measured by the Spitzer Space Telescope, the first ever direct detection of light from an extrasolar planet. This was done by subtracting the parent star's constant light and noting the difference as the planet transited in front of the star and was eclipsed behind it, providing a measure of the light from the planet itself. New measurements from this observation determined the planet's temperature as at least 750 °C (1,020 K; 1,380 °F). The nearly circular orbit of HD 209458 b was also confirmed.

The transit of HD 209458 b.

=== Spectral observation ===
On February 21, 2007, NASA and Nature released news that HD 209458 b was one of the first two extrasolar planets to have their spectra observed, the other one being HD 189733 b. This was long seen as the first mechanism by which extrasolar but non-sentient life forms could be searched for, by way of influence on a planet's atmosphere. A group of investigators led by Jeremy Richardson of NASA's Goddard Space Flight Center spectrally measured HD 209458 b's atmosphere in the range of 7.5 to 13.2 micrometres. The results defied theoretical expectations in several ways. The spectrum had been predicted to have a peak at 10 micrometres, which would have indicated water vapor in the atmosphere, but such a peak was absent, indicating no detectable water vapor. Another unpredicted peak was observed at 9.65 micrometres, which the investigators attributed to clouds of silicate dust, a phenomenon not previously observed. Another unpredicted peak occurred at 7.78 micrometres, for which the investigators did not have an explanation. A separate team led by Mark Swain of the Jet Propulsion Laboratory reanalyzed the Richardson et al. data, and had not yet published their results when the Richardson et al. article came out, but made similar findings.

On 23 June 2010, astronomers announced they have measured a superstorm (with windspeeds of up to 7,000 km/h (2,000 m/s; 4,000 mph)) for the first time in the atmosphere of HD 209458 b. The very high-precision observations done by ESO's Very Large Telescope and its powerful CRIRES spectrograph of carbon monoxide gas show that it is streaming at enormous speed from the extremely hot day side to the cooler night side of the planet. The observations also allow another exciting "first"—measuring the orbital speed of the exoplanet itself, providing a direct determination of its mass.

In July 2014, NASA announced finding very dry atmospheres on HD 209458 b and two other exoplanets (HD 189733 b and WASP-12b) orbiting Sun-like stars.

As of 2021, the spectra of planetary atmosphere taken by different instruments remains highly inconsistent, indicating either metal-poor atmosphere, temperatures below blackbody equilibrium or disequilibrium atmosphere chemistry.

== Rotation ==
In August 2008, the measurement of HD 209458 b's Rossiter–McLaughlin effect and hence spin–orbit angle is −4.4 ± 1.4°.

The study in 2012, updated the spin-orbit angle to −5±7°.

== Physical characteristics ==
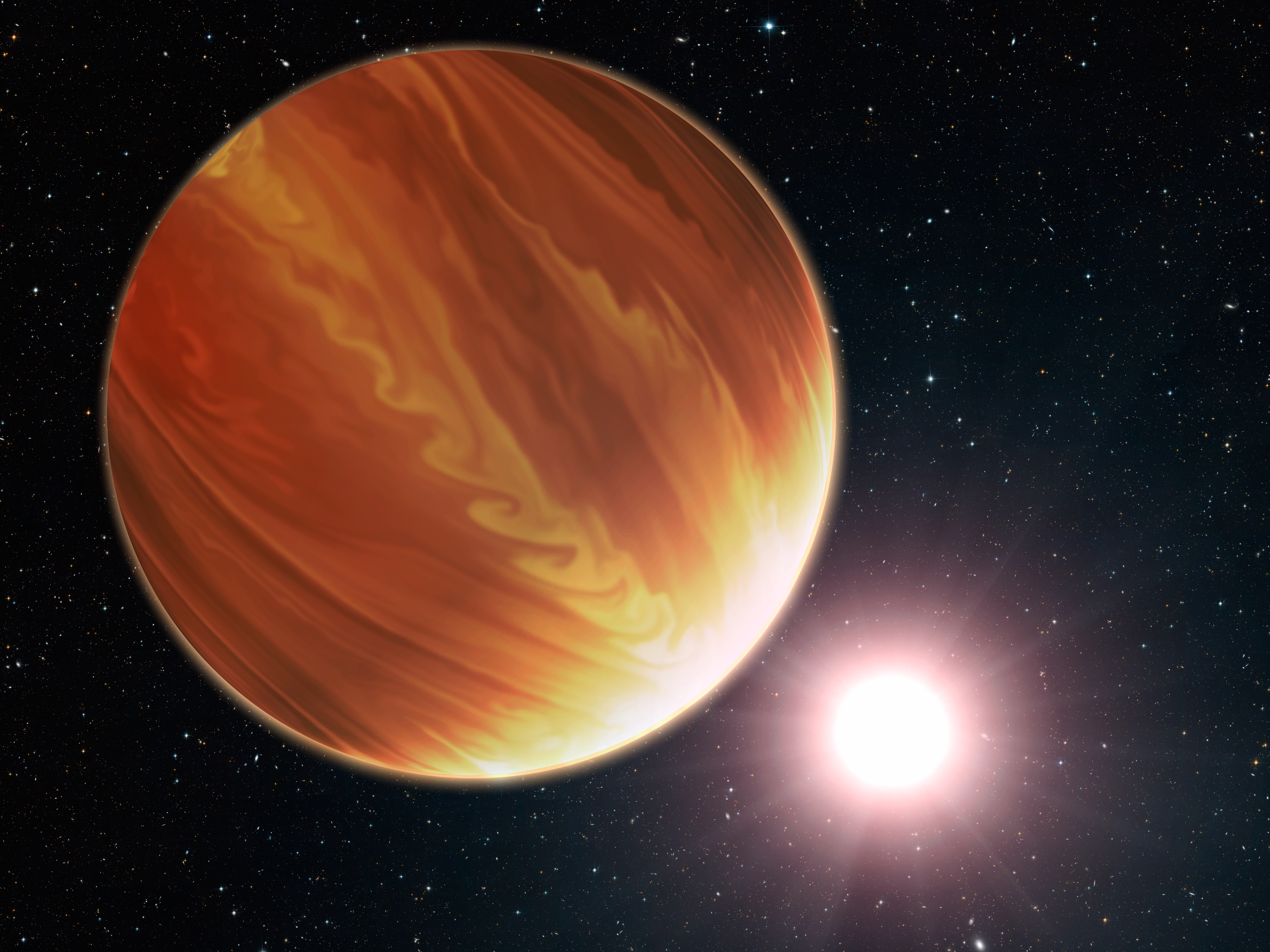
An artistic illustration of HD 209458 b by NASA, ESA, and G. Bacon (STScI)

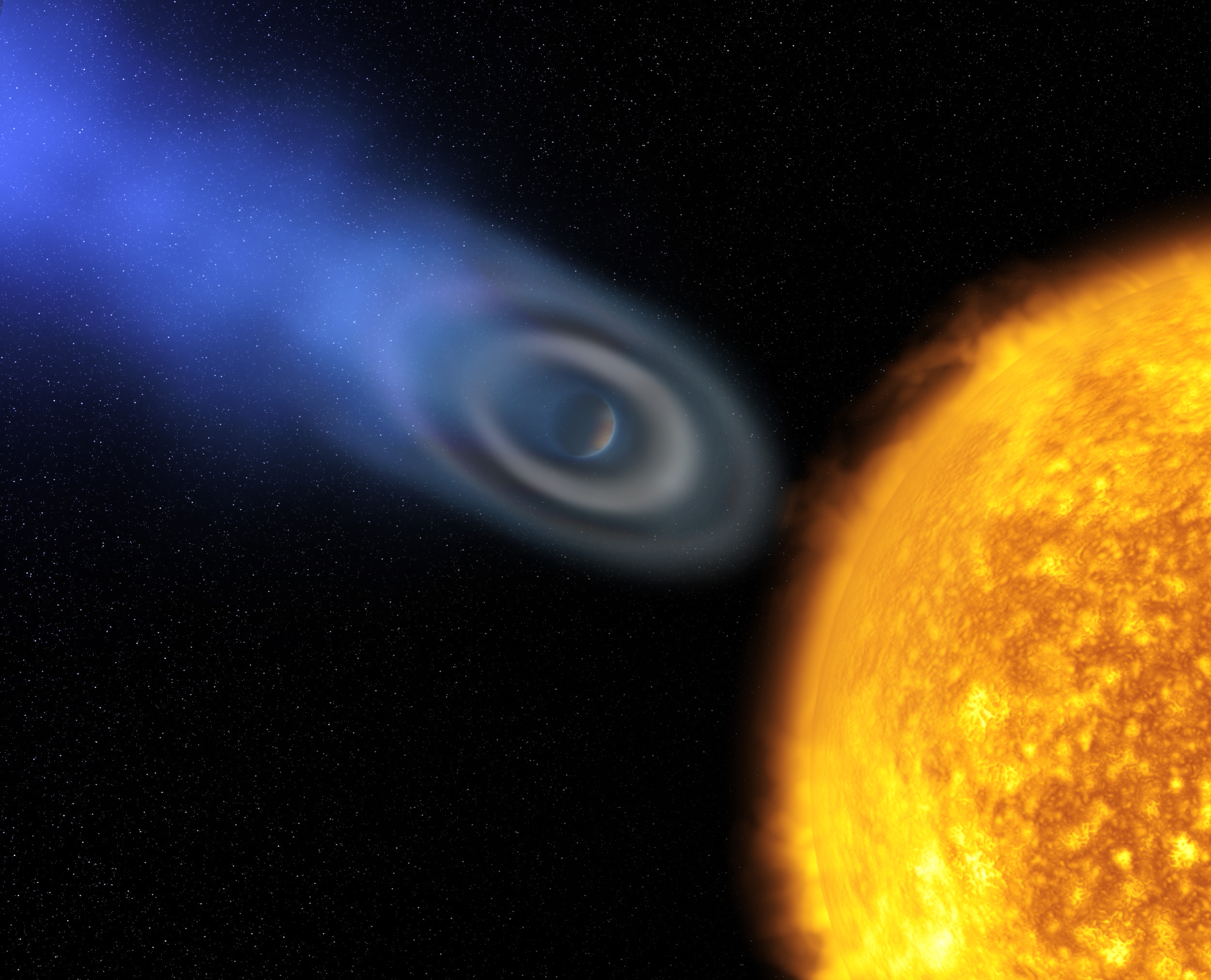
Artist impression of HD 209458 b

=== Stratosphere and upper clouds ===
The atmosphere is at a pressure of one bar at an altitude of 1.29 Jupiter radii above the planet's center.

Where the pressure is 33 ± 5 millibars, the atmosphere is clear (probably hydrogen) and its Rayleigh effect is detectable. At that pressure, the temperature is 2,200 ± 260 K (1,900 ± 260 °C; 3,500 ± 470 °F).

Observations by the orbiting Microvariability and Oscillations of STars telescope initially limited the planet's albedo (or reflectivity) below 0.3, making it a surprisingly dark object. (The geometric albedo has since been measured to be 0.038 ± 0.045.) In comparison, Jupiter has a much higher albedo of 0.52. This would suggest that HD 209458 b's upper cloud deck is either made of less reflective material than is Jupiter's, or else has no clouds and Rayleigh-scatters incoming radiation like Earth's dark ocean. Models since then have shown that between the top of its atmosphere and the hot, high pressure gas surrounding the mantle, there exists a stratosphere of cooler gas. This implies an outer shell of dark, opaque, hot clouds; usually thought to consist of vanadium and titanium oxides, but other compounds like tholins cannot be ruled out yet. A 2016 study indicates the high-altitude cloud cover is patchy with about 57 percent coverage. The Rayleigh-scattering heated hydrogen rests at the top of the stratosphere; the absorptive portion of the cloud deck floats above it at 25 millibars.

=== Exosphere ===
On November 27, 2001, astronomers announced that they had detected sodium in the atmosphere of the planet, using observations with the Hubble Space Telescope. This was the first planetary atmosphere outside the Solar System to be measured. The core of the sodium line runs from pressures of 50 millibar to a microbar. This turns out to be about a third the amount of sodium at HD 189733 b.

The additional data did not confirm the presence of sodium in the atmosphere of HD 209458 b as in 2020.

In 2003–4, astronomers used the Hubble Space Telescope Imaging Spectrograph to discover an enormous ellipsoidal envelope of hydrogen, carbon and oxygen around the planet that reaches 10,000 K (10,000 °C; 20,000 °F). The hydrogen exosphere extends to a distance R_{H}=3.1 R_{J}, much larger than the planetary radius of 1.32 R_{J}. At this temperature and distance, the Maxwell–Boltzmann distribution of particle velocities gives rise to a significant "tail" of atoms moving at speeds greater than the escape velocity. The planet is estimated to be losing about 100–500 million kg (0.2–1 billion lb) of hydrogen per second. Analysis of the starlight passing through the envelope shows that the heavier carbon and oxygen atoms are being blown from the planet by the extreme "hydrodynamic drag" created by its evaporating hydrogen atmosphere. The hydrogen tail streaming from the planet is approximately 200,000 km (100,000 mi) long, which is roughly equivalent to its diameter.

It is thought that this type of atmosphere loss may be common to all planets orbiting Sun-like stars closer than around 0.1 AU (10 million km; 9 million mi). HD 209458 b will not evaporate entirely, although it may have lost up to about 7% of its mass over its estimated lifetime of 5 billion years. It may be possible that the planet's magnetic field may prevent this loss, because the exosphere would become ionized by the star, and the magnetic field would contain the ions from loss.

=== Atmosphere composition ===
On April 10, 2007, Travis Barman of the Lowell Observatory announced evidence that the atmosphere of HD 209458 b contained water vapor. Using a combination of previously published Hubble Space Telescope measurements and new theoretical models, Barman found strong evidence for water absorption in the planet's atmosphere. His method modeled light passing directly through the atmosphere from the planet's star as the planet passed in front of it. However, this hypothesis is still being investigated for confirmation.

Barman drew on data and measurements taken by Heather Knutson, a student at Harvard University, from the Hubble Space Telescope, and applied new theoretical models to demonstrate the likelihood of water absorption in the atmosphere of the planet. The planet orbits its parent star every three and a half days, and each time it passes in front of its parent star, the atmospheric contents can be analyzed by examining how the atmosphere absorbs light passing from the star directly through the atmosphere in the direction of Earth.

According to a summary of the research, atmospheric water absorption in such an exoplanet renders it larger in appearance across one part of the infrared spectrum, compared to wavelengths in the visible spectrum. Barman took Knutson's Hubble data on HD 209458 b, applied to his theoretical model, and allegedly identified water absorption in the planet's atmosphere.

On April 24, the astronomer David Charbonneau, who led the team that made the Hubble observations, cautioned that the telescope itself may have introduced variations that caused the theoretical model to suggest the presence of water. He hoped that further observations would clear the matter up in the following months. As of April 2007, further investigation is being conducted.

On October 20, 2009, researchers at JPL announced the discovery of water vapor, carbon dioxide, and methane in the atmosphere.

The refined spectra obtained in 2021 has detected instead water vapor, carbon monoxide, hydrogen cyanide, methane, ammonia and acetylene, all consistent with the extremely high carbon to oxygen molar ratio of 1.0 (while Sun has C/O molar ratio of 0.55). If true, the HD 209458 b may be a prime example of the carbon planet.

== Magnetic field ==
In 2014, a magnetic field around HD 209458 b was inferred from the way hydrogen was evaporating from the planet. It is the first (indirect) detection of a magnetic field on an exoplanet. The magnetic field is estimated to be about one tenth as strong as Jupiter's.

Since HD 209458 b orbits less than 0.1 AU from its host star, theorists hypothesized that it may cause stellar flaring synchronized to the orbital period of the exoplanet. A 2011 search for these magnetic star-planet interactions that would result in coronal radio emissions did not detect any signal. Similarly, no magnetospheric radio emissions were detected from the planet either.

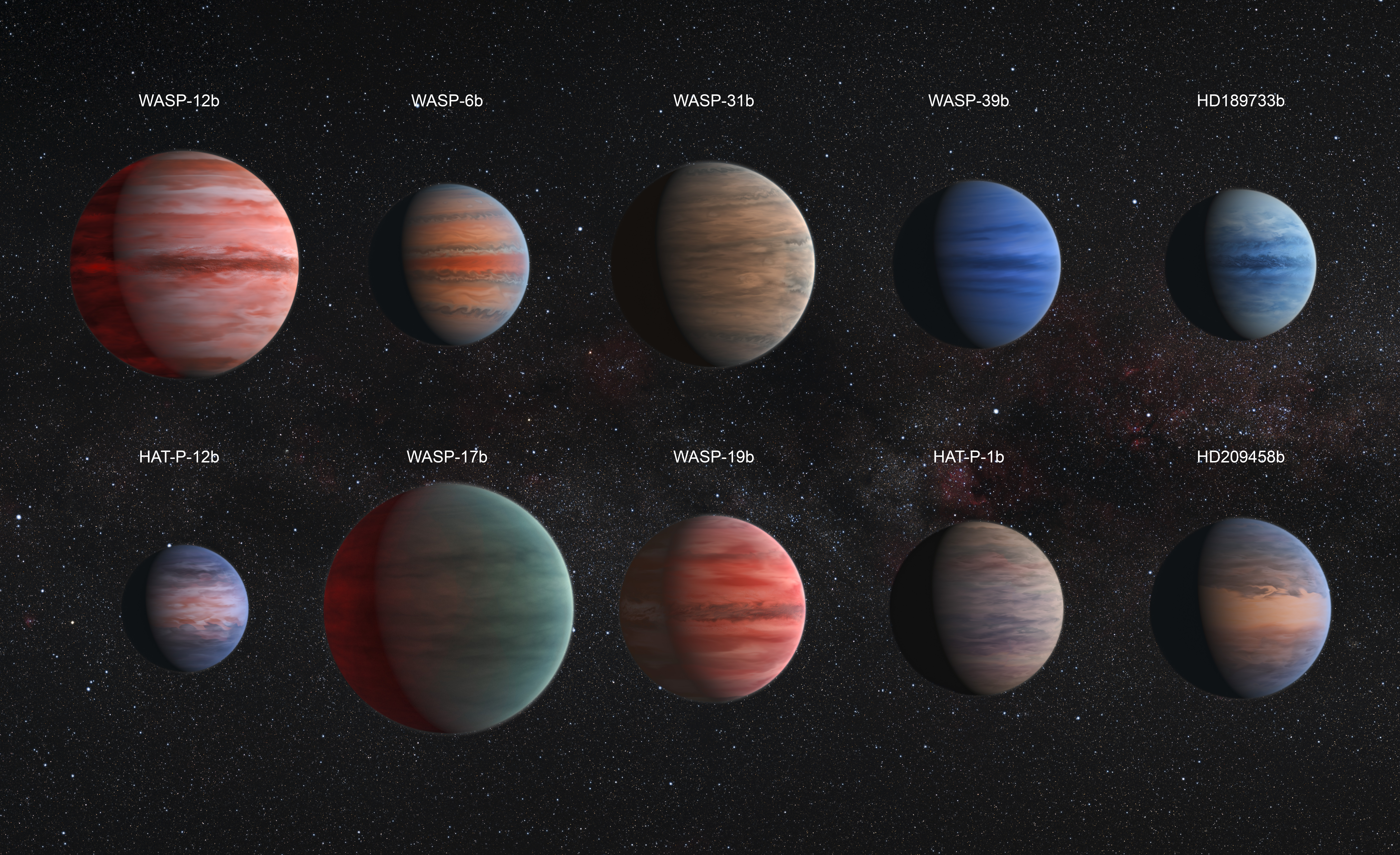
Comparison of "hot Jupiter" exoplanets (artist concept). From top left to lower right: WASP-12b, WASP-6b, WASP-31b, WASP-39b, HD 189733b, HAT-P-12b, WASP-17b, WASP-19b, HAT-P-1b and HD 209458b.

== See also ==
- 51 Pegasi b
- YZ Ceti another extra solar planet with evidence of magnetic fields
- HAT-P-11b another extra solar planet with evidence of magnetic fields
- Tau Boötis b another extra solar planet with evidence of magnetic fields
- List of exoplanets discovered before 2000
