= Travis Barman =

American astronomer

Travis Barman is a professor at the Lunar and Planetary Laboratory at the University of Arizona, specializing in the theoretical and observational aspects of extrasolar planets. Barman was previously at the Lowell Observatory in Flagstaff, Arizona, from 2006 until 2013. While an astronomer at Lowell, he studied a combination of the previously published Hubble Space Telescope measurements and new theoretical models, and found strong evidence for water absorption in the atmosphere of HD 209458 b.

A planet about 150 light years away from earth, HD 209458 b was known previously to contain an evaporating hydrogen atmosphere, along with oxygen and carbon. Though the planet is only 7 million kilometers away from its star, the planet is not hot enough to break the water molecules. HD 209458 b, a transiting planet, passes in front of its star, where it can be viewed from earth every three and a half days. When this happens, water vapor in the planet's atmosphere causes the planet to appear slightly larger in the infrared part of the starlight than in the visible portion. Barman found the water signature after applying new theoretical models he developed to visible and infrared Hubble data collected by then-Harvard graduate student Heather Knutson in 2007, which measured the perceived size of the planet over a broad range of wavelengths.
