= HD 149026 =

Star in the constellation Hercules

HD 149026 / Ogma
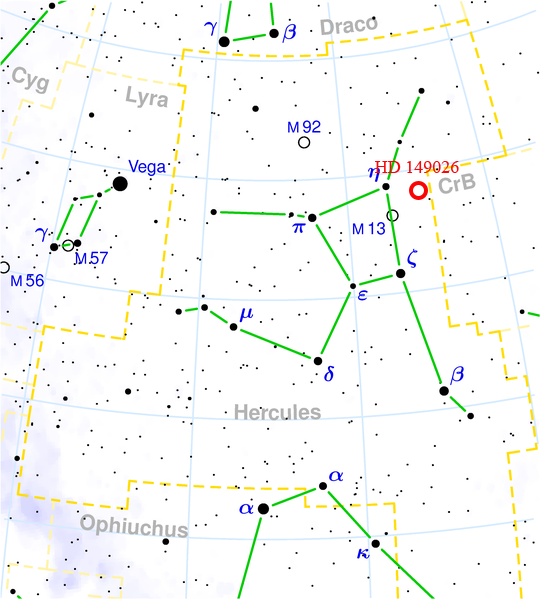
- Location of HD 149026 (circled in red)

Observation data Epoch J2000.0 Equinox ICRS
- Constellation: Hercules
- Right ascension: 16^{h} 30^{m} 29.61858^{s}
- Declination: +38° 20′ 50.3090″
- Apparent magnitude (V): 8.15

Characteristics
- Evolutionary stage: subgiant
- Spectral type: G0 IV
- Apparent magnitude (B): 8.76
- B−V color index: 0.611

Astrometry
Radial velocity (R_{v})	−17.93±0.13 km/s
Proper motion (μ)	RA: −77.963 mas/yr Dec.: 52.682 mas/yr
Parallax (π)	13.1203±0.0162 mas
Distance	248.6 ± 0.3 ly (76.22 ± 0.09 pc)
Absolute magnitude (M_{V})	3.65±0.12

Details
Mass	1.345±0.020 M_{☉}
Radius	1.541^{+0.046}_{−0.042} R_{☉}
Luminosity	3.03^{+0.20}_{−0.18} L_{☉}
Surface gravity (log g)	4.189^{+0.020}_{−0.021} cgs
Temperature	6,147±50 K
Metallicity [Fe/H]	0.36±0.05 dex
Rotational velocity (v sin i)	6.0±0.5 km/s
Age	2.6^{+0.3}_{−0.2} Gyr

Other designations
- Ogma, BD+38°2787, HD 149026, HIP 80838, SAO 65349, TOI-2024, TIC 255930614, GSC 03063-01587

Database references
SIMBAD	data
Exoplanet Archive	data

HD 149026, also named Ogma /ˈɒɡmə/, is a yellow subgiant star approximately 249 light-years from the Sun in the constellation of Hercules. An exoplanet (designated HD 149026 b, later named Smertrios) orbits the star.

== Nomenclature ==
HD 149026 is the star's identifier in the Henry Draper Catalog. Following its discovery in 2005 the planet was designated HD 149026 b.

In July 2014 the International Astronomical Union (IAU) launched NameExoWorlds, a process for giving proper names to certain exoplanets and their host stars. The process involved public nomination and voting for the new names. In December 2015, the IAU announced the winning names were Ogma for this star and Smertrios for its planet.

The winning names based on those submitted by the Club d'Astronomie de Toussaint of France; namely 'Ogmios' and 'Smertrios'. Ogmios was a Gallo-Roman deity and Smertrios was a Gallic deity of war. The IAU substituted the name of Ogma, a deity of eloquence, writing, and great physical strength in the Celtic mythologies of Ireland and Scotland, and who may be related to Ogmios, because 'Ogmios' is the name of an asteroid (189011 Ogmios).

In 2016, the IAU organized a Working Group on Star Names (WGSN) to catalog and standardize proper names for stars. In its first bulletin of July 2016, the WGSN explicitly recognized the names of exoplanets and their host stars approved by the Executive Committee Working Group Public Naming of Planets and Planetary Satellites, including the names of stars adopted during the 2015 NameExoWorlds campaign. This star is now so entered in the IAU Catalog of Star Names.

== Properties ==
The star is thought to be more massive, larger, and brighter than the Sun. The higher mass means that despite its considerably younger age (2.0 Ga) it is already much more evolved than the Sun. The internal fusion of hydrogen in the core of the star is about at an end and the star is cooling towards red gianthood. At a distance of 249 light-years, the star is not visible to the unaided eye. However, it should be easily seen in binoculars or a small telescope.

The star is over twice as enriched with chemical elements heavier than hydrogen and helium as the Sun. Because of this and the fact that the star is relatively bright, a group of astronomers in N2K Consortium began to study the star. The star's anomalous composition as measured may be surface pollution only, from the intake of heavy-element planetesimals.

== Planetary system ==
In 2005 an unusual extrasolar planet was discovered to be orbiting the star. Designated HD 149026 b, it was detected transiting the star allowing its diameter to be measured. It was found to be smaller than other transiting planets known at the time, meaning it is unusually dense for a closely orbiting giant planet. In 2007, the temperature of the giant planet was calculated to be 2,300 K (2,030 °C; 3,680 °F), generating so much infrared heat that it glows. It was proposed that the planet absorbs nearly all the sunlight and radiates it into space as heat. Subsequent studies have not confirmed this, with a 2018 study finding the planet to be highly reflective (with a Bond albedo of 0.53), along with a lower temperature.

The HD 149026 planetary system
Companion (in order from star)	Mass	Semimajor axis (AU)	Orbital period (days)	Eccentricity	Inclination (°)	Radius
b (Smertrios)	0.324±0.011 M_{J}	0.04364±0.00022	2.87588874(59)	0.0028+0.019 −0.0024	84.50+0.60 −0.52	0.811+0.029 −0.027 R_{J}

== See also ==
- 51 Pegasi
- Lists of exoplanets
