= Gregory W. Henry =

American astronomer

Gregory W. Henry is an astronomer and research scientist for Tennessee State University. In 1999, Henry led one of two teams that discovered the first transiting extrasolar planet, HD 209458 b. The other team was led by David Charbonneau.

Henry was also involved in the discovery of HD 149026 b.
