= David Charbonneau =

Canadian astronomer

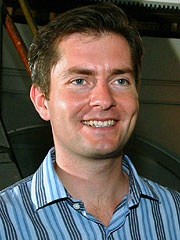
- Born: Ottawa, Ontario, Canada
- Citizenship: Canadian, U.S.A.
- Education: University of Toronto (BSc); Harvard University (PhD)
- Known for: Detection and characterization of exoplanets
- Scientific career
- Workplaces: Harvard University
- Thesis: Shadows and Reflections of Extrasolar Planets (2001)
- Doctoral advisor: Robert W. Noyes, Timothy M. Brown
- Doctoral students: Heather A. Knutson

David Brian Charbonneau is a professor of Astronomy at Harvard University. His research focuses on the development of novel techniques for the detection and characterization of exoplanets orbiting nearby, Sun-like stars.

== Early life and education ==
David Charbonneau was born in Ottawa, Ontario. He is the son of Brian Charbonneau, a geologist, and Sylvia Charbonneau, a physician.

When he was around 12 years old, he visited Pacific Rim National Park with his family, where he spent time playing in tide pools and observing the variety of organisms that lived in the intertidal zone. He credits this experience with sparking an early interest in science. When he was in high school, he read Stephen Hawking's A Brief History of Time. Intrigued by the ideas in the book, he decided to pursue studies in physics and astronomy, rather than biology.

Charbonneau received a Bachelor of Science degree in math, physics, and astronomy from the University of Toronto in 1996. At the suggestion of his friend Sara Seager, he applied to the graduate program in astronomy at Harvard University and was accepted. As a graduate student in 1999, he used a 4-inch telescope to make the first detection of an exoplanet eclipsing (or transiting) its parent star, which yielded the first ever constraint on the composition of a planet outside the Solar system. He earned a PhD in astronomy in 2001.

In 2004, the Astronomical Society of the Pacific awarded him the Robert J. Trumpler Award for his graduate thesis entitled Shadows and Reflections of Extrasolar Planets.

== Career ==
Charbonneau was a R. A. Millikan Postdoctoral Scholar in Astronomy at the California Institute of Technology from 2001 until 2004. He returned to Harvard in 2004 where he joined the faculty of the Department of Astronomy.

Charbonneau was a founding member of the Trans-Atlantic Exoplanet Survey, which used a worldwide network of humble automated telescopes to survey hundreds of thousands of stars to detect 5 more exoplanets by this technique. Charbonneau also pioneered the use of space-based observatories to undertake the first studies of the atmospheres of these distant worlds: In 2001 he used the Hubble Space Telescope to study directly the chemical make-up of the atmosphere enshrouding one of these exoplanets, and in 2005, he led the team that used the Spitzer Space Telescope to make the first direct detection of the light emitted by an exoplanet. He is currently leading the NSF-funded MEarth Project and is a member of the NASA Kepler Mission Team. Each of these projects aims to detect Earth-like planets that might be suitable abodes for life beyond the Solar System.

== Awards and honors ==
- Robert J. Trumpler Award (2004)
- Alfred P. Sloan Research Fellow (2006–2008)
- David and Lucile Packard Fellowship for Science and Engineering (2006–2011)
- NASA Exceptional Scientific Achievement Medal (2006)
- Discover Magazine Scientist of the Year (2007)
- National Science Foundation's Alan T. Waterman Award (2009)
- Raymond and Beverly Sackler Prize in the Physical Sciences (2012)
- Blavatnik Award (2016)
- Kavli Prize in Astrophysics (2024)

== Selected publications ==
- Charbonneau, David; Brown, Timothy M.; Latham, David W.; Mayor, Michel (January 20, 2000). "Detection of Planetary Transits Across a Sun-like Star". The Astrophysical Journal. 529 (1): L45–L48. arXiv:astro-ph/9911436. Bibcode:2000ApJ...529L..45C. doi:10.1086/312457. PMID 10615033. S2CID 16152423.
- Charbonneau, David; Brown, Timothy M.; Noyes, Robert W.; Gilliland, Ronald L. (March 20, 2002). "Detection of an Extrasolar Planet Atmosphere". The Astrophysical Journal. 568 (1): 377–384. arXiv:astro-ph/0111544. Bibcode:2002ApJ...568..377C. doi:10.1086/338770.
- Charbonneau, David; Allen, Lori E.; Megeath, S. Thomas; Torres, Guillermo; Alonso, Roi; Brown, Timothy M.; Gilliland, Ronald L.; Latham, David W.; Mandushev, Georgi (June 10, 2005). "Detection of Thermal Emission from an Extrasolar Planet". The Astrophysical Journal. 626 (1): 523–529. arXiv:astro-ph/0503457. Bibcode:2005ApJ...626..523C. doi:10.1086/429991. S2CID 13296966.
- Knutson, Heather A.; Charbonneau, David; Allen, Lori E.; Fortney, Jonathan J.; Agol, Eric; Cowan, Nicolas B.; Showman, Adam P.; Cooper, Curtis S.; Megeath, S. Thomas (2007). "A map of the day–night contrast of the extrasolar planet HD 189733b". Nature. 447 (7141): 183–186. arXiv:0705.0993. Bibcode:2007Natur.447..183K. doi:10.1038/nature05782. PMID 17495920. S2CID 4402268.
- Fressin, Francois; Torres, Guillermo; Rowe, Jason F.; Charbonneau, David; Rogers, Leslie A.; Ballard, Sarah; Batalha, Natalie M.; Borucki, William J.; Bryson, Stephen T. (2012). "Two Earth-sized planets orbiting Kepler-20" (PDF). Nature. 482 (7384): 195–198. arXiv:1112.4550. Bibcode:2012Natur.482..195F. doi:10.1038/nature10780. PMID 22186831. S2CID 3182266.
- Dressing, Courtney D.; Charbonneau, David (March 28, 2013). "The Occurrence Rate of Small Planets around Small Stars". The Astrophysical Journal. 767 (1): 95. arXiv:1302.1647. Bibcode:2013ApJ...767...95D. doi:10.1088/0004-637X/767/1/95. S2CID 29441006.

== Personal life ==
Charbonneau is married to Margaret Bourdeaux, a global health advocate and physician, with whom he has four daughters. His sister-in-law is Carolyn Bourdeaux.
