= Ultra-short period planet =

Planet with an orbital period less than one day

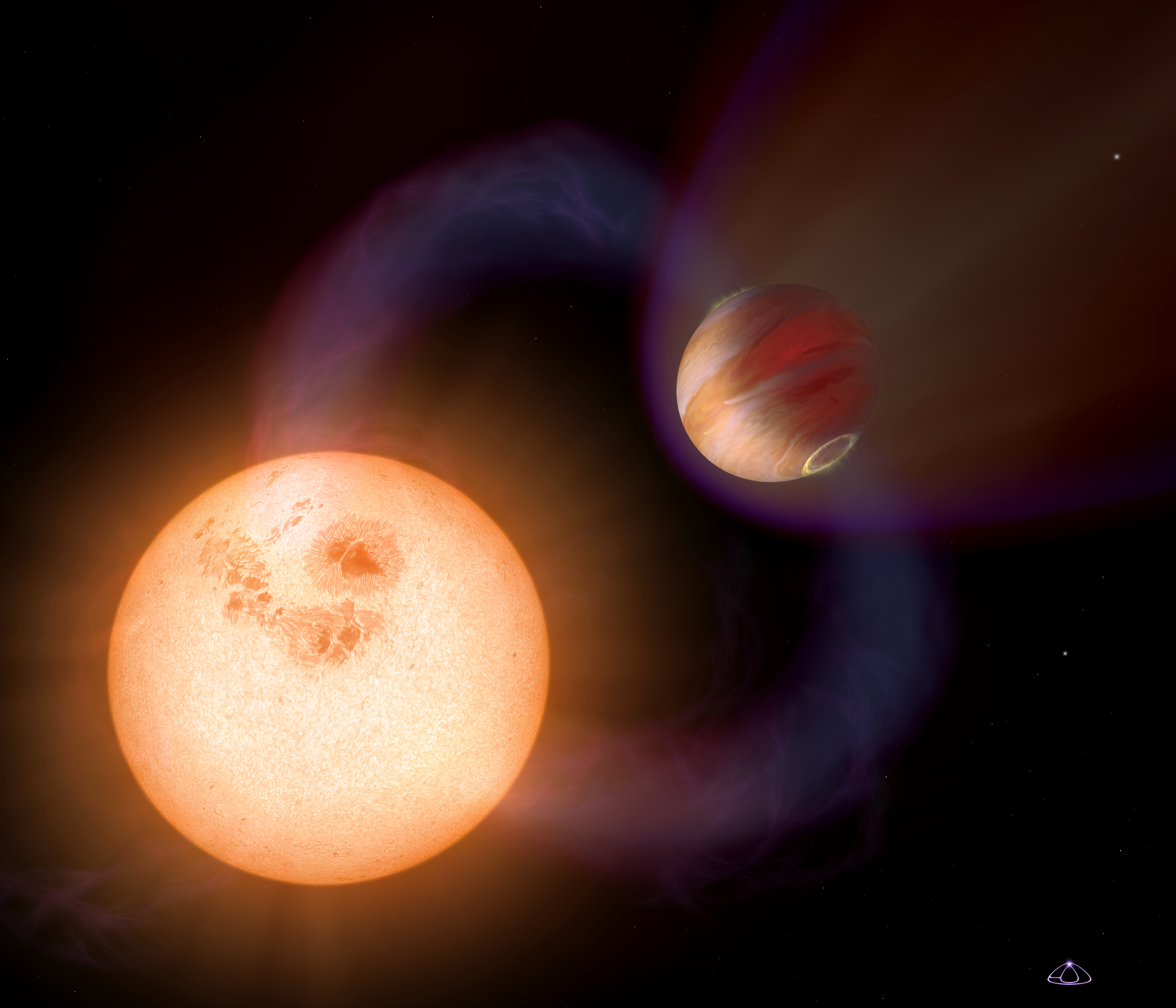
Artist's impression of a Jovian ultra-short period planet orbiting a star

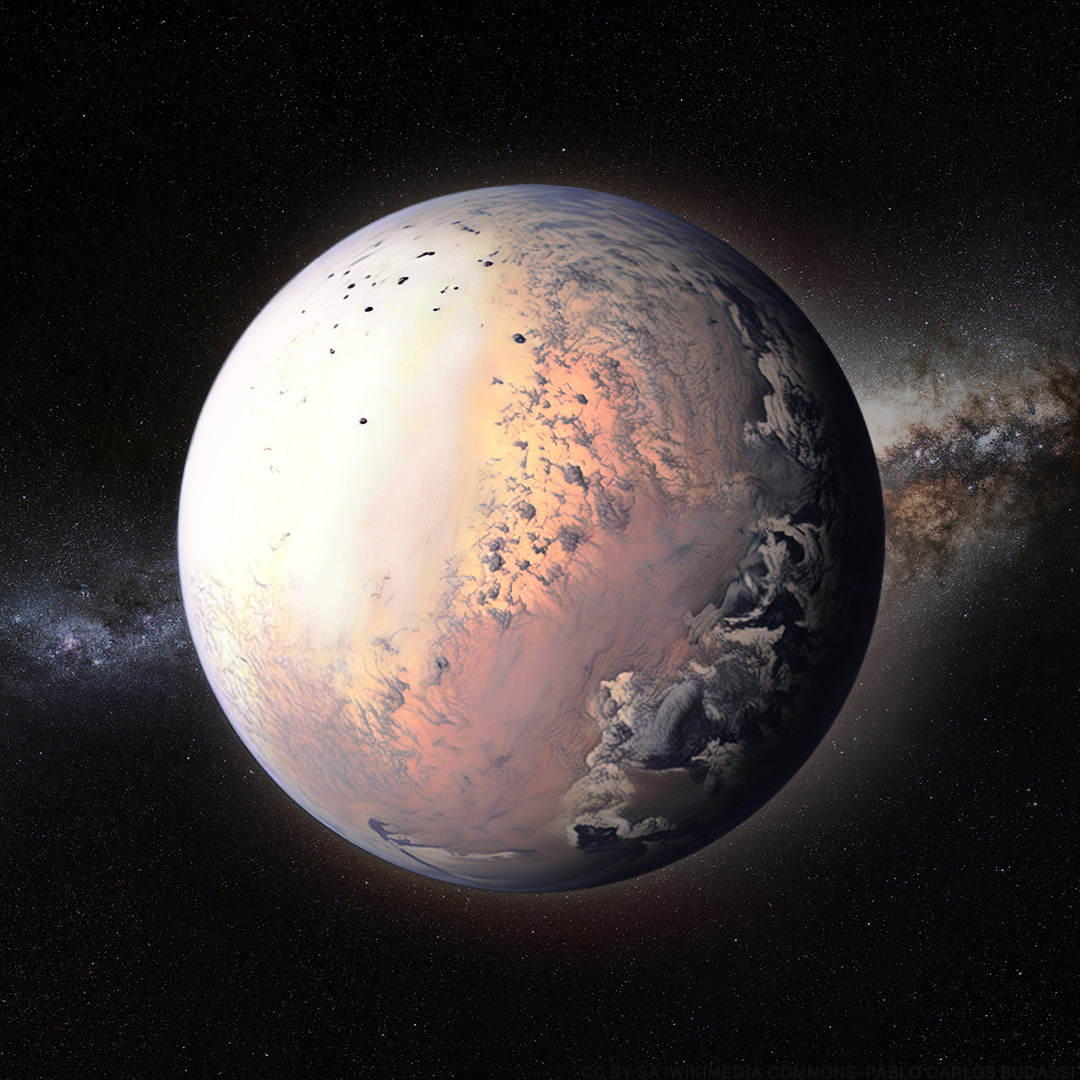
Artist impression of terrestrial ultra-short period planet

An ultra-short period (USP) planet is a type of exoplanet with an orbital period of less than one Earth day (24 hours). At this short distance, tidal interactions lead to relatively rapid orbital and spin evolution. Therefore when there is a USP planet around a mature main-sequence star, it is most likely that the planet has a circular orbit and is tidally locked. There are not many USP planets with sizes exceeding 2 Earth radii. There is a strong negative correlation between their occurrence rate and the mass of the host star. About one out of 200 Sun-like stars (G dwarfs) has an ultra-short-period planet, and their occurrence rate falls from 1.1%±0.4% for M dwarfs to 0.15%±0.05% for F dwarfs. Ultra-short-period planets also tend to orbit older stars. USP planets seem mostly consistent with an Earth-like composition of 70% rock and 30% iron, but K2-229b has a higher density, suggesting a more massive iron core. WASP-47e and 55 Cnc e, however, have a lower density and are compatible with pure rock, or a rocky-iron body surrounded by a layer of water (or other volatiles).

A difference between hot Jupiters and terrestrial USP planets is the proximity of planetary companions. Hot Jupiters are rarely found with other planets within a factor of 2–3 in orbital period or distance. In contrast, terrestrial USP planets almost always have longer-period planetary companions. The period ratio between adjacent planets tends to be larger if one of them is a USP planet suggesting the USP planet has undergone tidal orbital decay which may still be ongoing. USP planets also tend to have higher mutual inclinations with adjacent planets than for pairs of planets in wider orbits, suggesting that USP planets have experienced inclination excitation in addition to orbital decay.

There are several known giant planets with an orbital period shorter than one day. Their occurrence must be lower by at least an order of magnitude than that of terrestrial USP planets.

It had been proposed that USP planets were the rocky cores of evaporated hot Jupiters, however, the metallicity of the host stars of USP planets is lower than that of hot Jupiters' stars, so it seems more likely that USP planets are the cores of evaporated gas dwarfs. Other theories suggest that USP planets form as terrestrial planets and migrate inward over billions of years due to dynamical interactions with nearby planetary companions.

A study by the TESS-Keck Survey using 17 USP planets found that USP planets predominantly have an Earth-like compositions with iron core mass of about 32% and have masses below runaway accretion. USP planets are also almost always found in multiple-planet systems around stars with solar metallicity. As of 2025, 12 known Jovian USP planets have been found.

== Examples ==
Key (Classification)
🜨	Terrestrial planets
◌	Gas giant planets

Key (Illustration)
Artist's impression

Illustration	Name (Alternates)	Orbital period (Days)	Semimajor Axis (AU)	Key	Notes
	Kepler-974 d (KOI 1843.03)	0.177 (4h 15min)	Unknown	🜨	Shortest orbit around a main-sequence star (an M dwarf).
	TOI-2431 b	0.224 (5h 22min)	0.0063 ± 0.0001	🜨	Sixth-shortest for any known exoplanet, as of 2025. In about 31 million years, it will enter the roche lobe of the host star and be torn appart.
	Gliese 4256 b (TOI-6255 b)	0.2382 (5h 43min)	0.0054	🜨	Gliese 4256 b orbits so close to the host star that it has nearly passed the roche limit, causing the planet to be pulled into an egg-like shape. It is predicted that in around 400 million years, the planet will be ripped apart and engulfed by the star.
	K2-141b	0.2803244 ± 0.0000015 (6h 43min)	0.01064 ± 0.00016	🜨	Shortest-period planet with a precisely determined mass.
	PSR J2322-2650 b	0.322963997 (7h 45min)	0.0102	◌	PSR J2322-2650 b orbits so close that the radiation from the pulsar heats it about 2300 K. Due to the pulsar being considerably less luminous than many, the planet has survived to this day. Observations with JWST NIRSpec found an atmosphere rich in molecular carbon (C3, C2), with strong westward winds.
	Kepler-78b (KIC 8435766 b)	0.35500745(8) (8h 31min)	0.00901 ^{+0.00012}_{−0.00019}	🜨	Kepler-78b orbits extremely close that the planet's surface is estimated to be at a temperature of 2,200 K (1,930 °C; 3,500 °F) which is high enough to have stripped the planet of any stable atmosphere, but the liquid and solid portions of the planet should be stable that the planet is Earth-sized lava planet.
	TOI-561b	0.4465697 ± 0.0000003 (10h 43min)	0.01064 ± 0.00016	🜨	Lowest density of USP planet (3.8 ± 0.5 g cm^{−3}) as of April 2022. The low density of this planet is explained with a massive water layer, no hydrogen nor helium envelope, as well as a predicted water steam atmosphere. The steam atmosphere could be detected with the James Webb Space Telescope in the future. More complex models might be needed to fully explain the unusual properties of TOI-561b.
	K2-229b	0.584249 ± 0.000014 (14h 1min)	0.012888 ± 0.000130	🜨	Initially K2-229b was most likely rocky with a solid surface, like Earth itself. However, radial velocity measurements using the HARPS spectrograph later revealed that K2-229b was far denser and more massive than initially expected. The planet has a mass of 2.59 M_{🜨} and an extremely high density of about 8.9 g/cm^{3}, giving it about 91% more surface gravity than Earth. The unusually high mass and density of K2-229b indicates a Mercury-like composition dominated by an iron core taking up about 70% of the planet's mass.
	TOI-2109b	0.6725 (16h 8min)	0.01791 ± 0.00065	◌	Shortest orbital period among the hot Jupiters, at 0.6725 days (16.14 hours), and the highest rotational rate as well as the largest size and mass among the 12 known Jovian ultra-short period planets.
	SPECULOOS-3 b	0.719 (17h 15min)	0.00733	🜨	This planet orbits around SPECULOOS-3, the second smallest star to host a transiting planet.
	Janssen (55 Cancri Ae)	0.7365 (17h 40min)	0.01544 ± 0.00005	🜨	When Janssen was discovered, it was first thought to take about 2.8 days to orbit 55 Cancri A (Copernicus). It was later corrected to 0.7365 d (17.68 h), making it the shortest orbital period at that time. Due to its close proximity to the star, 55 Cancri Ae is extremely hot, with temperatures on the day side exceeding 3,000 Kelvin. The planet's thermal emission is observed to be variable, possibly as a result of volcanic activity. It has been proposed that 55 Cancri e could be a carbon planet.
	Banksia (WASP-19b)	0.7888399 (18h 55min)	0.01655 ± 0.00013	◌	At the time of discovery, WASP-19b was the shortest period transiting exoplanet discovered with the orbital period of 0.7888399 day. First exoplanet to have its secondary eclipse and orbital phases observed from the ground-based observations and first to have titanium oxide (TiO) detected in an exoplanet atmosphere.
	WASP-47e	0.7896 ± 0.000011 (18h 57min)	0.017	🜨	WASP-47e orbits closer than the hot Jupiter WASP-47 b, which is not expected for planetary systems containing Hot Jupiters, as a migrating gas giant is thought to kick out any small inner planets. In order for the system to come out the way it is now, the two gas giants (WASP-47 b and WASP-47c) likely would have to have formed before the lower-mass planets WASP-47e and WASP-47d. This is called two-stage planetary formation, and it is hypothesized that WASP-47b would have moved inwards and brought planet-forming material close to the star. Once most of the gas dissipates, the two gas-poor planets form nearby the large Hot Jupiter.
	Astrolábos (WASP-43b)	0.8135 (19h 31min)	0.01526 ± 0.00018	◌	At the time of discovery, Astrolábos was the third-shortest period known planet and the smallest known for a hot Jupiter. In addition, this planet also had the closest orbit to its host star (among hot Jupiters) at the time of its discovery, comparable only to the super-Earth planet GJ 1214 b. While hot Jupiters are known to have small orbital periods, planets with exceptionally small periods below three or four days are extremely rare; however, in the case of WASP-43b, the planet's proximity can be explained because its host star has a very low mass. The rarity of systems like that of WASP-43 (Gnomon) and its planet suggest that hot Jupiters do not usually occur around low-mass stars, or that such planets cannot maintain stable orbits around such stars.
	HIP 65Ab	0.9809734 ± 0.0000031 (23h 32min)	0.01782 ^{+0.00020}_{−0.00021}	◌	Due to the planet's vicinity to the star, tidal interactions are slowly causing its orbit to decay. As such, the planet is expected to spiral into HIP 65A and be destroyed by its Roche limit within somewhere between 80 million years and a few billion years.
