= K2-229 =

K-type main-sequence star

Observation data Epoch J2000 Equinox ICRS
- Constellation: Virgo
- Right ascension: 12^{h} 27^{m} 29.5848^{s}
- Declination: −06° 43′ 18.7660″
- Apparent magnitude (V): 10.98

Characteristics
- Evolutionary stage: Main sequence
- Spectral type: K2V

Astrometry
Proper motion (μ)	RA: −80.886±0.131 mas/yr Dec.: 7.434±0.090 mas/yr
Parallax (π)	9.7229±0.1020 mas
Distance	335 ± 4 ly (103 ± 1 pc)

Details
Mass	0.837 ^{+0.019}_{−0.025} M_{☉}
Radius	0.793 ^{+0.032}_{−0.020} R_{☉}
Luminosity	~0.407 L_{☉}
Surface gravity (log g)	4.56 ^{+0.03}_{−0.05} cgs
Temperature	5185 ± 32 K
Metallicity [Fe/H]	−0.06 ± 0.02 dex
Rotation	18.1 ± 0.3 days
Rotational velocity (v sin i)	2.4 ± 0.5 km/s
Age	5.4 ^{+5.2}_{−3.7} Gyr

Other designations
- EPIC 228801451, TYC 4947-834-1, 2MASS J12272958-0643188

Database references
SIMBAD	data
Exoplanet Archive	data

K2-229 (also designated EPIC 228801451 or TYC 4947-834-1) is a K-type main sequence star approximately 103 parsecs (335 light years) away in the constellation Virgo. It was observed by the Kepler Space Telescope during its K2 "Second Light" mission in Campaign 10.

== Planetary system ==
As of March 27, 2018, K2-229 has a system of three confirmed exoplanets.

The K2-229 planetary system
Companion (in order from star)	Mass	Semimajor axis (AU)	Orbital period (days)	Eccentricity	Inclination (°)	Radius
b	2.59 (± 0.43) M_{🜨}	0.012888	0.584249	0 (assumed)	83.9 ± 2.8	1.165 ^{+0.066}_{−0.048} R_{🜨}
c	<21.3 M_{🜨}	0.07577	8.32834	0 (assumed)	87.94 ± 0.18	2.12 ^{+0.11}_{−0.08} R_{🜨}
d	<25.1 M_{🜨}	0.1820 ± 0.00042	31.0 ± 1.1	0.39 ± 0.29	88.92 ± 0.24	2.64 ± 0.24 R_{🜨}

All three known planets transit their star and would orbit inside that of Mercury if placed in the Solar System. Only the innermost has a well determined mass and composition.

K2-229b

K2-229b is a Super-Earth with an iron-rich composition. It is about 17% larger than Earth by radius, but is almost 2.6 times more massive. Its high density indicates it has a core-mass fraction of about 68%, nearly identical to that of Mercury. It is believed that like Mercury, the huge core of K2-229 is the result of a giant impact event. However, unlike Mercury, it orbits extremely close to its host star, with one orbit taking a little over 14 hours to complete. K2-229b has a temperature of over 1,960 K to 2,330 K, hot enough to melt iron and likely giving it an atmosphere of silicate vapor.

K2-229c

K2-229c is a Mini-Neptune sized planet with a radius of 2.12 R_{🜨}. Its mass has not been accurately determined, so only an upper limit of 21.3 M_{🜨} can be given. However, a different method of radial velocity analysis gives the planet's mass at about 9.5 M_{🜨}. With an orbital period of 8.32 days, K2-229c has an equilibrium temperature of 800 K (527 °C; 980 °F) and a dayside temperature of 962 K (689 °C; 1,272 °F).

K2-229d

K2-229d is another Mini-Neptune with a radius of 2.64 R_{🜨}, meaning it is likely gaseous. Only a maximum mass of 25.1 M_{🜨} could be determined. The planet was detected by a single transit event lasting about two and a half hours long. There were two models for its orbital period: one where it took about 31 days to orbit and the second transit was during a large data gap; and another where it took over 50 days to orbit. The latter scenario was considered unlikely, as K2-229d would need to have a very eccentric orbit to exhibit such a short transit duration – so eccentric that its periapsis would cross the orbit of K2-229c and destabilize the system. It has an equilibrium temperature of 522 K (249 °C; 480 °F).

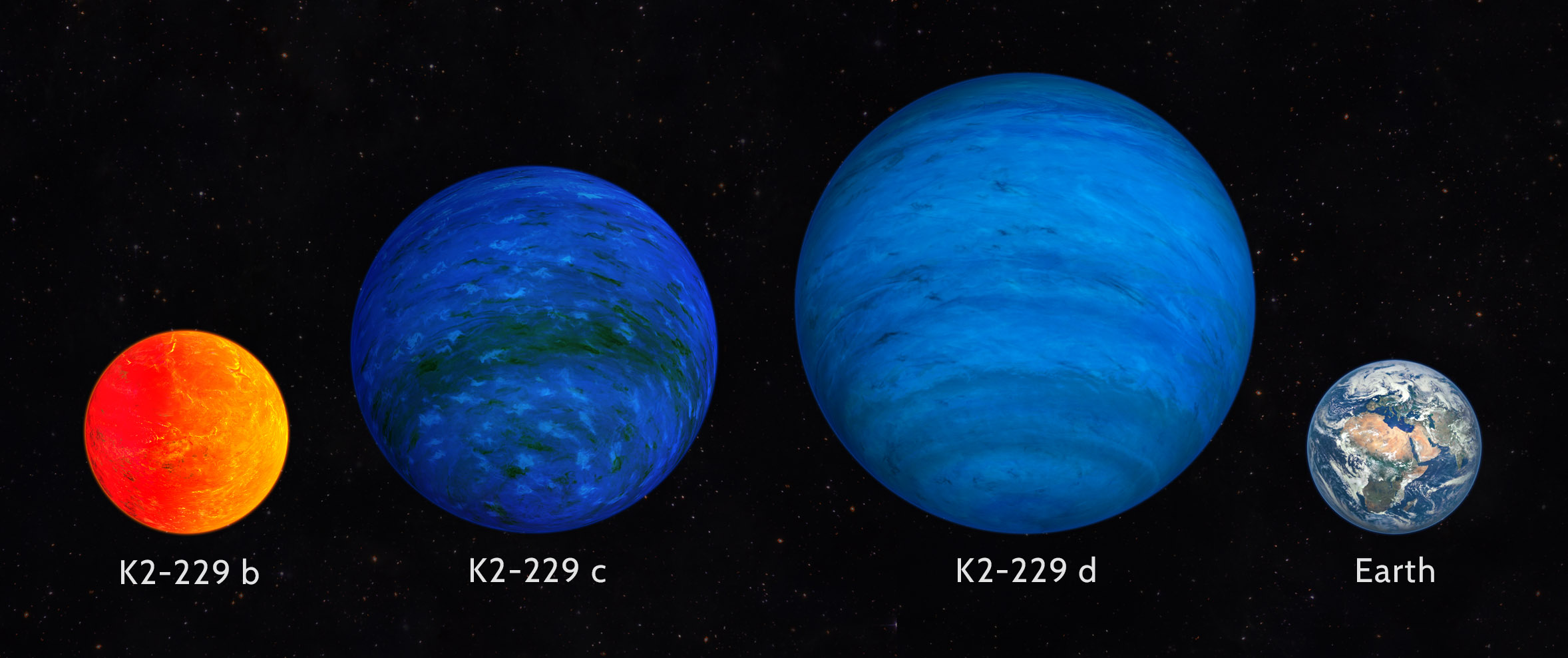
Size comparison of the three known planets of HD 21749 (artistic concept) with Earth

== See also ==
- K2-141b
- WASP-47
