= K2-229b =

Exoplanet

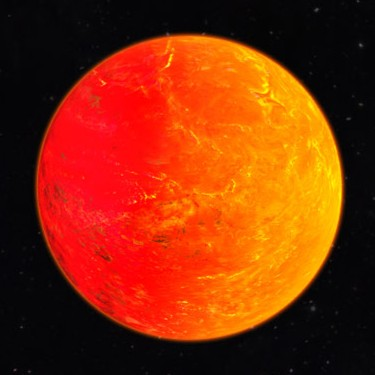
- Artist impression of K2-229b

Discovery
- Discovery site: Kepler Space Observatory
- Discovery date: 2018
- Detection method: Transit

Orbital characteristics
- Semi-major axis: 0.012888 (± 0.000130) AU
- Eccentricity: 0
- Orbital period (sidereal): 0.584249 (± 0.000014) d 14.02 h
- Inclination: 83.9 (± 2.8)
- Star: K2-229

Physical characteristics
- Mean radius: 1.164±0.066 R_{🜨}
- Mass: 2.59±0.43 M_{🜨}
- Mean density: 8.9±2.1 g cm^{−3}
- Surface gravity: 1.91 ^{+0.59}_{−0.48} g
- Temperature: 1,960 K (1,690 °C; 3,070 °F) (equilibrium); 2,332 K (2,059 °C; 3,738 °F) (day side)

K2-229b (previously designated EPIC 228801451.01) is an extremely hot, solid, iron-rich exoplanet in a close orbit around the active K-dwarf K2-229 in the constellation Virgo, 335 light years away from Earth.

== Characteristics ==
=== Mass, radius, and temperature ===
K2-229b is a relatively Earth-sized planet, first identified using the transit method, where a planet passes in front of its host star and blocks a tiny fraction of its light. When the planet was first discovered, only its radius was known. It was determined to be 1.165 R_{🜨}, or about 16.5% larger than Earth. A planet of this size is most likely rocky with a solid surface, like Earth itself. However, radial velocity measurements using the HARPS spectrograph revealed that K2-229b was far denser and more massive than initially expected. The planet has a mass of 2.59 M_{🜨} and an extremely high density of about 8.9 g/cm^{3}, giving it about 91% more surface gravity than Earth. The unusually high mass and density of K2-229b indicates a Mercury-like composition dominated by an iron core taking up about 70% of the planet's mass.

Due to its extremely tight orbit, K2-229b is one of the hottest planets yet found. It has an equilibrium temperature of 1,960 K (1,690 °C; 3,070 °F), hot enough to melt iron. The day side has an even higher temperature in excess of 2,330 K (2,060 °C; 3,730 °F).

=== Orbit and rotation ===
K2-229b has one of the shortest orbital periods known, with one full orbit taking just 0.584 days (14 hours) to complete. The planet orbits its host star at a distance of 0.012888 AU, nearly 100 times closer in than Earth. For comparison, our Solar System's innermost planet, Mercury, takes 88 days to orbit at 0.39 AU. K2-229b has an orbital eccentricity of 0 and is most likely tidally locked with its host star.

=== Host star ===
K2-229b orbits the orange dwarf star K2-229, which is about 79% the radius and 84% the mass of the Sun, with a temperature of 5185 K and an age of about 5.4 billion years. For comparison, the Sun has a temperature of 5778 K and is 4.5 billion years old. K2-229 has a visual magnitude of 10.985, too faint to be seen without a telescope. It is noted for being extremely active.

== Formation, composition, and conditions ==
The discovery of the high mass and density of K2-229b was unexpected. "When we saw this planet that was Earth-sized, we thought it would have an Earth-like composition. But it turns out it's more like Mercury", said the astrophysicist Jessie Christiansen, who was not part of the team which discovered K2-229b. The unusual Mercury-like composition of K2-229b is believed to offer insight into how it and other high-density, Mercury-like planets could have formed.

There are multiple hypotheses on how K2-229b became so dense, with one stating that much of the planet's atmosphere was eroded away by stellar radiation from its nearby, active star. Another hypothesis suggests that K2-229b was formed when two planets in the system collided, much like the theory on how the Moon was created from a collision between Earth and another planet. As of March 2018, all these theories are still in play, and there is not enough evidence to either prove or refute them.

Researchers also noted K2-229b's position in its planetary system. "Interestingly K2-229b is also the innermost planet in a system of at least 3 planets, though all three orbit much closer to their star than Mercury. More discoveries like this will help us shed light on the formation of these unusual planets, as well as Mercury itself", commented Dr. David Armstrong, one of the members of the team from the University of Warwick's Astronomy and Astrophysics Group which discovered the planet.

K2-229b is noted for being quite similar to Mercury, with about the same core-mass fraction of 68 ^{+17}_{−25}%. However, the former is far closer to its host star and is more susceptible to mantle evaporation than the latter. With a day side temperature of over 2,330 K (assuming it is tidally locked with its host star), K2-229 is expected to have at least a thin atmosphere of silicate vapor created from the high temperatures on the star-facing side of the planet. Despite the high activity of K2-229, the planet is not expected to completely lose this atmosphere. If K2-229b has a magnetic field it can resist atmospheric erosion, meaning that mantle evaporation is extremely unlikely to have resulted in the planet's iron-rich composition. That, and K2-229b is estimated to only lose 1.3×10^{−5} M_{🜨} per one million years, too little to remove any more than a few percent of its total mass over its lifetime.

== See also ==
- Iron planet
- K2-141b, another high-density rocky planet taking less than 1 day to orbit its star
- Kepler-10b
- COROT-7b
- Kepler-78b
