= Exoplanet orbital and physical parameters =

This page describes exoplanet orbital and physical parameters.

== Orbital parameters ==
Most known extrasolar planet candidates have been discovered using indirect methods and therefore only some of their physical and orbital parameters can be determined. For example, out of the six independent parameters that define an orbit, the radial-velocity method can determine four: semi-major axis, eccentricity, longitude of periastron, and time of periastron. Two parameters remain unknown: inclination and longitude of the ascending node.

=== Distance from star and orbital period ===
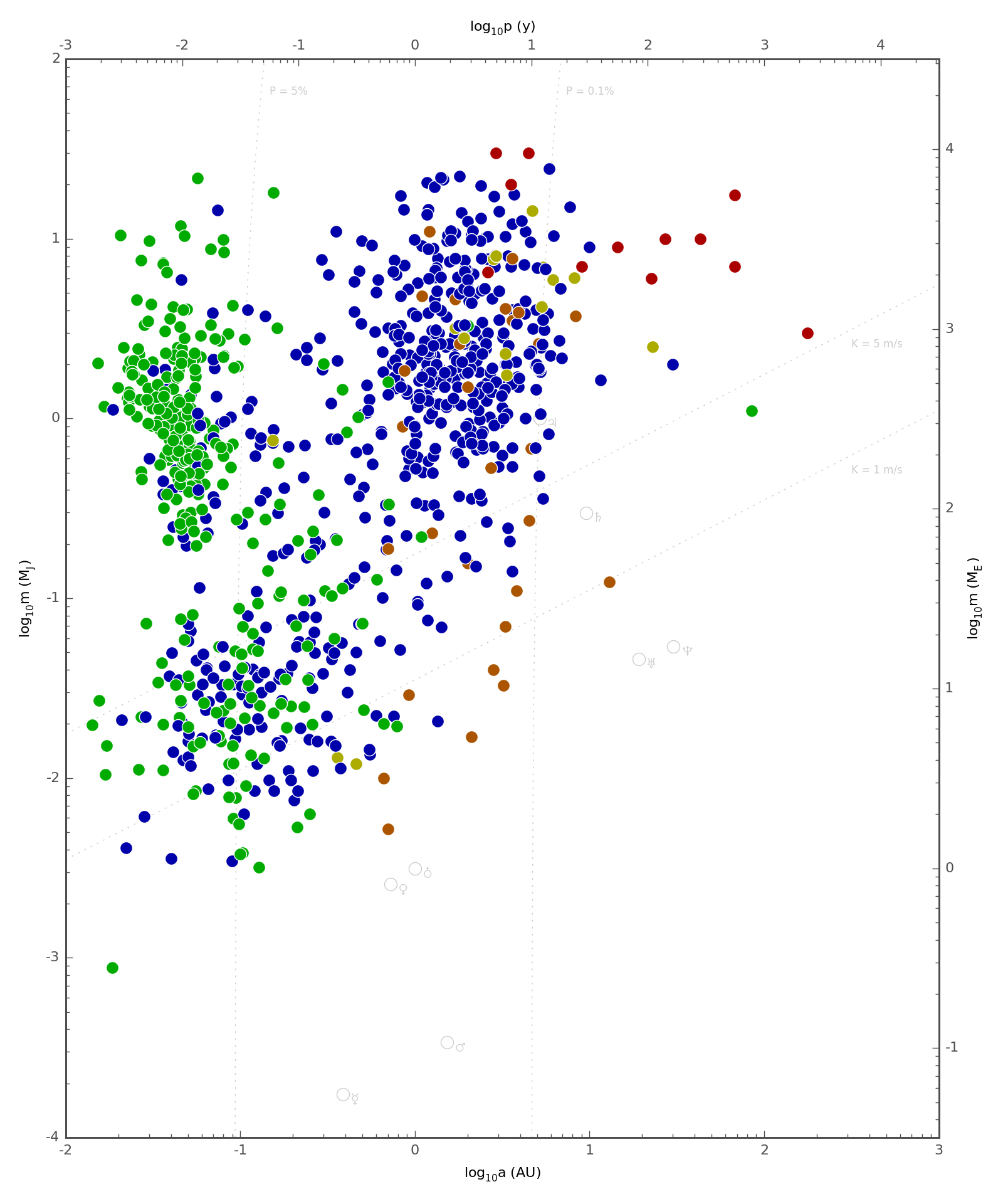
Log-log scatterplot showing masses, orbital radii, and period of all extrasolar planets discovered through September 2014, with colors indicating method of detection: transit timing / radial velocity direct imaging / microlensing; For reference, Solar System planets are marked as gray circles. The horizontal axis plots the logarithm of the semi-major axis, and the vertical axis plots the logarithm of the mass.

There are exoplanets that are much closer to their parent star than any planet in the Solar System is to the Sun, and there are also exoplanets that are much further from their star. Mercury, the closest planet to the Sun at 0.4 astronomical units (AU), takes 88 days for an orbit, but the smallest known orbits of exoplanets have orbital periods of only a few hours, see Ultra-short period planet. The Kepler-11 system has five of its planets in smaller orbits than Mercury's. Neptune is 30 AU from the Sun and takes 165 years to orbit it, but there are exoplanets that are thousands of AU from their star and take tens of thousands of years to orbit, e.g. GU Piscium b.

The radial-velocity and transit methods are most sensitive to planets with small orbits. The earliest discoveries such as 51 Peg b were gas giants with orbits of a few days. These "hot Jupiters" likely formed further out and migrated inwards.

The direct imaging method is most sensitive to planets with large orbits, and has discovered some planets that have planet–star separations of hundreds of AU. However, protoplanetary disks are usually only around 100 AU in radius, and core accretion models predict giant planet formation to be within 10 AU, where the planets can coalesce quickly enough before the disk evaporates. Very-long-period giant planets may have been rogue planets that were captured, or formed close-in and gravitationally scattered outwards, or the planet and star could be a mass-imbalanced wide binary system with the planet being the primary object of its own separate protoplanetary disk. Gravitational instability models might produce planets at multi-hundred AU separations but this would require unusually large disks. For planets with very wide orbits up to several hundred thousand AU it may be difficult to observationally determine whether the planet is gravitationally bound to the star.

Most planets that have been discovered are within a couple of AU from their host star because the most used methods (radial-velocity and transit) require observation of several orbits to confirm that the planet exists and there has only been enough time since these methods were first used to cover small separations. Some planets with larger orbits have been discovered by direct imaging but there is a middle range of distances, roughly equivalent to the Solar System's gas giant region, which is largely unexplored. Direct imaging equipment for exploring that region was installed on two large telescopes that began operation in 2014, e.g. Gemini Planet Imager and VLT-SPHERE. The microlensing method has detected a few planets in the 1–10 AU range. It appears plausible that in most exoplanetary systems, there are one or two giant planets with orbits comparable in size to those of Jupiter and Saturn in the Solar System. Giant planets with substantially larger orbits are now known to be rare, at least around Sun-like stars.

The distance of the habitable zone from a star depends on the type of star and this distance changes during the star's lifetime as the size and temperature of the star changes.

A study of the planet WASP-12b from 2019 came to the conclusion that the orbit of WASP-12b is decaying as a result of tidal interactions between the planet and the host star WASP-12. Due to this decay, the orbital period will get shorter and the planet will get closer to the host star, until it becomes part of the star in 2.90±0.14 million years.

=== Eccentricity ===
The eccentricity of an orbit is a measure of how elliptical (elongated) it is. All the planets of the Solar System except for Mercury have near-circular orbits (e<0.1). Most exoplanets with orbital periods of 20 days or less have near-circular orbits, i.e. very low eccentricity. That is thought to be due to tidal circularization: reduction of eccentricity over time due to gravitational interaction between two bodies. The mostly sub-Neptune-sized planets found by the Kepler spacecraft with short orbital periods have very circular orbits. By contrast, the giant planets with longer orbital periods discovered by radial-velocity methods have quite eccentric orbits. (As of July 2010, 55% of such exoplanets have eccentricities greater than 0.2, whereas 17% have eccentricities greater than 0.5.) Moderate to high eccentricities (e>0.2) of giant planets are not an observational selection effect, because a planet can be detected about equally well regardless of the eccentricity of its orbit. The statistical significance of elliptical orbits in the ensemble of observed giant planets is somewhat surprising, because current theories of planetary formation suggest that low-mass planets should have their orbital eccentricity circularized by gravitational interactions with the surrounding protoplanetary disk. However, as a planet grows more massive and its interaction with the disk becomes nonlinear, it may induce eccentric motion of the surrounding disk's gas, which in turn may excite the planet's orbital eccentricity. Low eccentricities are correlated with high multiplicity (number of planets in the system). Low eccentricity is needed for habitability, especially advanced life.

For weak Doppler signals near the limits of the current detection ability, the eccentricity becomes poorly constrained and biased towards higher values. It is suggested that some of the high eccentricities reported for low-mass exoplanets may be overestimates, because simulations show that many observations are also consistent with two planets on circular orbits. Reported observations of single planets in moderately eccentric orbits have about a 15% chance of being a pair of planets. This misinterpretation is especially likely if the two planets orbit with a 2:1 resonance. With the exoplanet sample known in 2009, a group of astronomers estimated that "(1) around 35% of the published eccentric one-planet solutions are statistically indistinguishable from planetary systems in 2:1 orbital resonance, (2) another 40% cannot be statistically distinguished from a circular orbital solution" and "(3) planets with masses comparable to Earth could be hidden in known orbital solutions of eccentric super-Earths and Neptune mass planets".

Radial velocity surveys found exoplanet orbits beyond 0.1 AU to be eccentric, particularly for large planets. Transit data obtained by the Kepler spacecraft, is consistent with the RV surveys and also revealed that smaller planets tend to have less eccentric orbits.

=== Inclination vs. spin–orbit angle ===
Orbital inclination is the angle between a planet's orbital plane and another plane of reference. For exoplanets, the inclination is usually stated with respect to an observer on Earth: the angle used is that between the normal to the planet's orbital plane and the line of sight from Earth to the star. Therefore, most planets observed by the transit method are close to 90 degrees. Because the word 'inclination' is used in exoplanet studies for this line-of-sight inclination then the angle between the planet's orbit and the star's rotation must use a different word and is termed the spin–orbit angle or spin–orbit alignment. In most cases the orientation of the star's rotational axis is unknown. The Kepler spacecraft has found a few hundred multi-planet systems and in most of these systems the planets all orbit in nearly the same plane, much like the Solar System. However, a combination of astrometric and radial-velocity measurements has shown that some planetary systems contain planets whose orbital planes are significantly tilted relative to each other. More than half of hot Jupiters have orbital planes substantially misaligned with their parent star's rotation. A substantial fraction of hot-Jupiters even have retrograde orbits, meaning that they orbit in the opposite direction from the star's rotation. Rather than a planet's orbit having been disturbed, it may be that the star itself flipped early in their system's formation due to interactions between the star's magnetic field and the planet-forming disk.

=== Periastron precession ===
Periastron precession is the rotation of a planet's orbit within the orbital plane, i.e. the axes of the ellipse change direction. In the Solar System, perturbations from other planets are the main cause, but for close-in exoplanets the largest factor can be tidal forces between the star and planet. For close-in exoplanets, the general relativistic contribution to the precession is also significant and can be orders of magnitude larger than the same effect for Mercury. Some exoplanets have significantly eccentric orbits, which makes it easier to detect the precession. The effect of general relativity can be detectable in timescales of about 10 years or less.

=== Nodal precession ===
Nodal precession is rotation of a planet's orbital plane. Nodal precession is more easily seen as distinct from periastron precession when the orbital plane is inclined to the star's rotation, the extreme case being a polar orbit.

WASP-33 is a fast-rotating star that hosts a hot Jupiter in an almost polar orbit. The quadrupole mass moment and the proper angular momentum of the star are 1900 and 400 times, respectively, larger than those of the Sun. This causes significant classical and relativistic deviations from Kepler's laws. In particular, the fast rotation causes large nodal precession because of the star's oblateness and the Lense–Thirring effect.

== Rotation and axial tilt ==
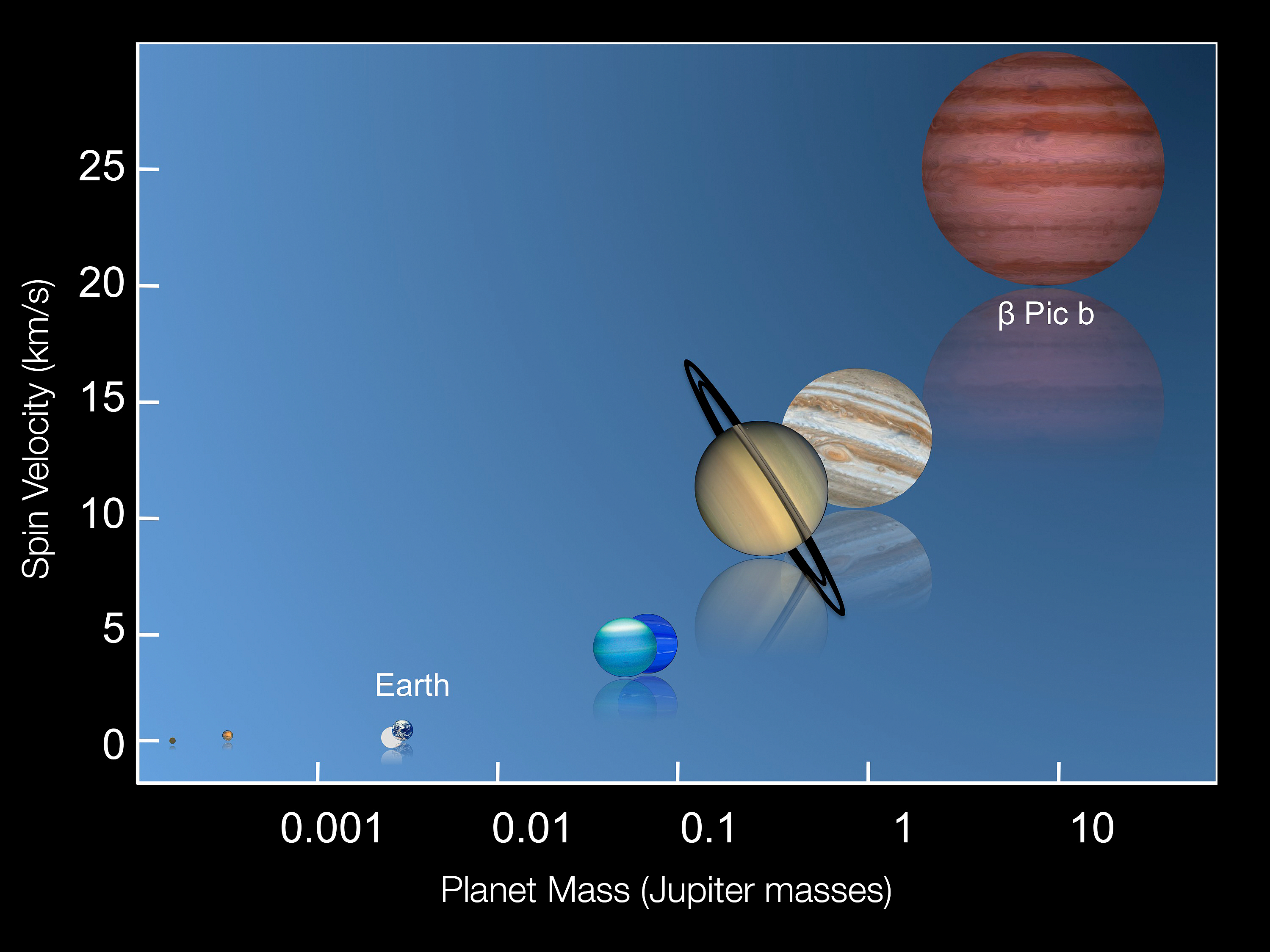
Plot of equatorial spin velocity vs. mass for planets comparing Beta Pictoris b to the Solar System planets.

In April 2014, the first measurement of a planet's rotation period was announced: the length of day for the super-Jupiter gas giant Beta Pictoris b is 8 hours (based on the assumption that the axial tilt of the planet is small.) With an equatorial rotational velocity of 25 km per second, this is faster than for the giant planets of the Solar System, in line with the expectation that the more massive a giant planet, the faster it spins. Beta Pictoris b's distance from its star is 9 AU. At such distances the rotation of Jovian planets is not slowed by tidal effects. Beta Pictoris b is still warm and young and over the next hundreds of millions of years, it will cool down and shrink to about the size of Jupiter, and if its angular momentum is preserved, then as it shrinks, the length of its day will decrease to about 3 hours and its equatorial rotation velocity will speed up to about 40 km/s. The images of Beta Pictoris b do not have high enough resolution to directly see details but doppler spectroscopy techniques were used to show that different parts of the planet were moving at different speeds and in opposite directions from which it was inferred that the planet is rotating. With the next generation of large ground-based telescopes it will be possible to use doppler imaging techniques to make a global map of the planet, like the mapping of the brown dwarf Luhman 16B in 2014. A 2017 study of the rotation of several gas giants found no correlation between rotation rate and mass of the planet.

As of 2024 the axial tilt of 4 exoplanets have been measured with one of them VHS 1256 b having a Uranus like tilt of 90 degrees ± 25 degrees.

=== Origin of spin and tilt of terrestrial planets ===
Giant impacts have a large effect on the spin of terrestrial planets. The last few giant impacts during planetary formation tend to be the main determiner of a terrestrial planet's rotation rate. On average the spin angular velocity will be about 70% of the velocity that would cause the planet to break up and fly apart; the natural outcome of planetary embryo impacts at speeds slightly larger than escape velocity. In later stages terrestrial planet spin is also affected by impacts with planetesimals. During the giant impact stage, the thickness of a protoplanetary disk is far larger than the size of planetary embryos so collisions are equally likely to come from any direction in three-dimensions. This results in the axial tilt of accreted planets ranging from 0 to 180 degrees with any direction as likely as any other with both prograde and retrograde spins equally probable. Therefore, prograde spin with a small axial tilt, common for the Solar System's terrestrial planets except Venus, is not common in general for terrestrial planets built by giant impacts. The initial axial tilt of a planet determined by giant impacts can be substantially changed by stellar tides if the planet is close to its star and by satellite tides if the planet has a large satellite.

=== Tidal effects ===
For most planets, the rotation period and axial tilt (also called obliquity) are not known, but a large number of planets have been detected with very short orbits (where tidal effects are greater) that will probably have reached an equilibrium rotation that can be predicted (i.e. tidal lock, spin–orbit resonances, and non-resonant equilibria such as retrograde rotation).

Gravitational tides tend to reduce the axial tilt to zero but over a longer timescale than the rotation rate reaches equilibrium. However, the presence of multiple planets in a system can cause axial tilt to be captured in a resonance called a Cassini state. There are small oscillations around this state and in the case of Mars these axial tilt variations are chaotic.

Hot Jupiters' close proximity to their host star means that their spin–orbit evolution is mostly due to the star's gravity and not the other effects. Hot Jupiters' rotation rate is not thought to be captured into spin–orbit resonance because of the way in which such a fluid-body reacts to tides; a planet like this therefore slows down into synchronous rotation if its orbit is circular, or, alternatively, it slows down into a non-synchronous rotation if its orbit is eccentric. Hot Jupiters are likely to evolve towards zero axial tilt even if they had been in a Cassini state during planetary migration when they were further from their star. Hot Jupiters' orbits will become more circular over time, however the presence of other planets in the system on eccentric orbits, even ones as small as Earth and as far away as the habitable zone, can continue to maintain the eccentricity of the Hot Jupiter so that the length of time for tidal circularization can be billions instead of millions of years.

The rotation rate of planet HD 80606 b is predicted to be about 1.9 days. HD 80606 b avoids spin–orbit resonance because it is a gas giant. The eccentricity of its orbit means that it avoids becoming tidally locked.

== Physical parameters ==
=== Mass ===
When a planet is found by the radial-velocity method, its orbital inclination i is unknown and can range from 0 to 90 degrees. The method is unable to determine the true mass (M) of the planet, but rather gives a lower limit for its mass, M sini. In a few cases an apparent exoplanet may be a more massive object such as a brown dwarf or red dwarf. However, the probability of a small value of i (say less than 30 degrees, which would give a true mass at least double the observed lower limit) is relatively low (1−√3/2 ≈ 13%) and hence most planets will have true masses fairly close to the observed lower limit.

If a planet's orbit is nearly perpendicular to the line of vision (i.e. i close to 90°), a planet can be detected through the transit method. The inclination will then be known, and the inclination combined with M sini from radial-velocity observations will give the planet's true mass.

Also, astrometric observations and dynamical considerations in multiple-planet systems can sometimes provide an upper limit to the planet's true mass.

In 2013 it was proposed that the mass of a transiting exoplanet can also be determined from the transmission spectrum of its atmosphere, as it can be used to constrain independently the atmospheric composition, temperature, pressure, and scale height, however a 2017 study found that the transmission spectrum cannot unambiguously determine the mass.

Transit-timing variation can also be used to find a planet's mass.

=== Radius, density, and bulk composition ===
Prior to recent results from the Kepler space observatory, most confirmed planets were gas giants comparable in size to Jupiter or larger because they are most easily detected. However, the planets detected by Kepler are mostly between the size of Neptune and the size of Earth.

If a planet is detectable by both the radial-velocity and the transit methods, then both its true mass and its radius can be determined, as well as its density. Planets with low density are inferred to be composed mainly of hydrogen and helium, whereas planets of intermediate density are inferred to have water as a major constituent. A planet of high density is inferred to be rocky, like Earth and the other terrestrial planets of the Solar System.

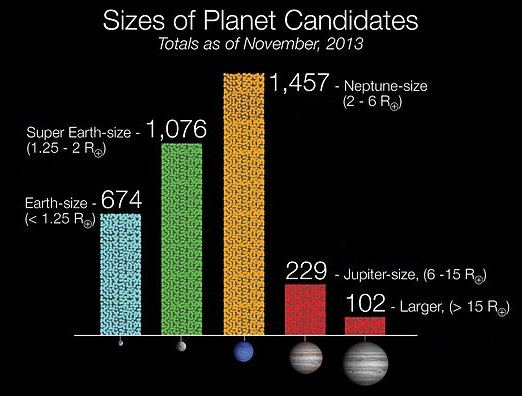
Sizes of Kepler Planet Candidates – based on 2,740 candidates orbiting 2,036 stars as of 4 November 2013 (NASA).

Comparison of sizes of planets with different compositions.

==== Gas giants, puffy planets, and super-Jupiters ====
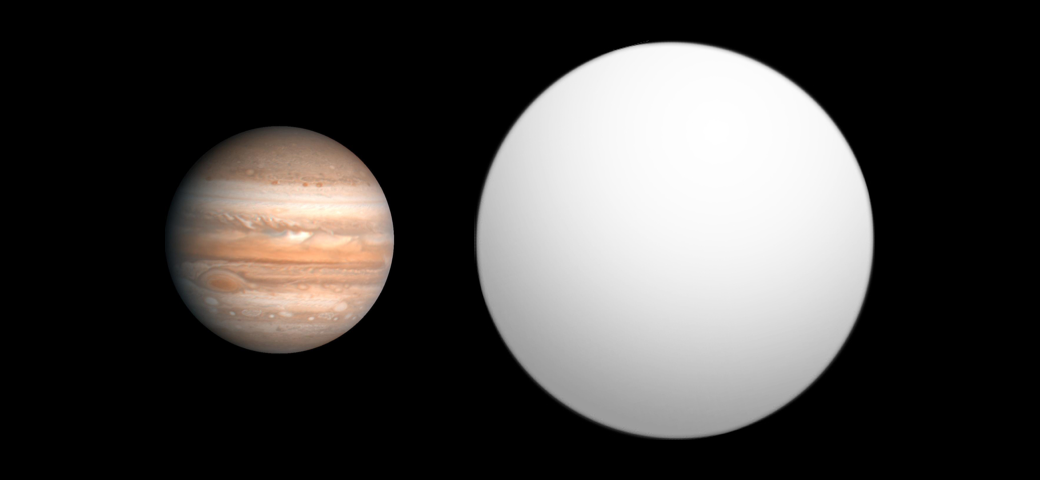
Size comparison of WASP-17b (right) with Jupiter (left).

Gaseous planets that are hot are caused by extreme proximity to their host star, or because they are still hot from their formation and are expanded by the heat. For colder gas planets, there is a maximum radius which is slightly larger than Jupiter which occurs when the mass reaches a few Jupiter-masses. Adding mass beyond this point causes the radius to shrink.

Even when taking heat from the star into account, many transiting exoplanets are much larger than expected given their mass, meaning that they have surprisingly low density. See the magnetic field section for one possible explanation.

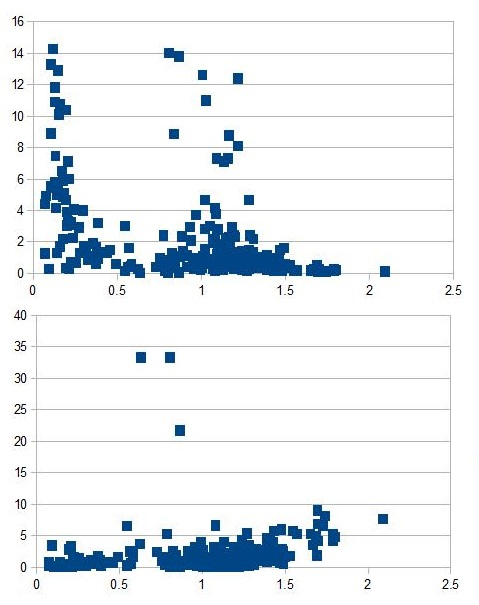
Plots of exoplanet density and radius. (Note: Data from NASA catalog July 2014, excluding objects described as having unphysically high density) Top: Density vs. Radius. Bottom: Diffusity=1/Density vs. Radius. Units: Radius in Jupiter radii (R_{Jup}). Density in g/cm^{3}. Diffusity in cm^{3}/g. These plots show that there are a wide range of densities for planets between Earth and Neptune size, then the planets of 0.6 R_{Jup} size are very low-density and there are very few of them, then the gas giants have a large range of densities.

Besides the inflated hot Jupiters, there is another type of low-density planet: super-puffs with masses only a few times Earth's but with radii larger than Neptune. The planets around Kepler-51 are far less dense (far more diffuse) than the inflated hot Jupiters as can be seen in the plots on the right where the three Kepler-51 planets stand out in the diffusity vs. radius plot.

==== Ice giants and super-Neptunes ====
Kepler-101b was the first super-Neptune discovered. It has three times Neptune's mass but its density suggests that heavy elements make up more than 60% of its total mass, unlike hydrogen–helium-dominated gas giants.

==== Super-Earths, mini-Neptunes, and gas dwarfs ====
If a planet has a radius and/or mass between that of Earth and Neptune, then there is a question about whether the planet is rocky like Earth, a mixture of volatiles and gas like Neptune, a small planet with a hydrogen/helium envelope (mini-Jupiter), or of some other composition.

Some of the Kepler transiting planets with radii in the range of 1–4 Earth radii have had their masses measured by radial-velocity or transit-timing methods. The calculated densities show that up to 1.5 Earth radii, these planets are rocky and that density increases with increasing radius due to gravitational compression. However, between 1.5 and 4 Earth radii the density decreases with increasing radius. This indicates that above 1.5 Earth radii, planets tend to have increasing amounts of volatiles and gas. Despite this general trend, there is a wide range of masses at a given radius, which could be because gas planets can have rocky cores of different masses and compositions, and could also be due to photoevaporation of volatiles. Thermal evolutionary atmosphere models suggest a radius of 1.75 times that of Earth as a dividing line between rocky and gaseous planets. Excluding close-in planets that have lost their gas envelope due to stellar irradiation, studies of the metallicity of stars suggest a dividing line of 1.7 Earth radii between rocky planets and gas dwarfs, then another dividing line at 3.9 Earth radii between gas dwarfs and gas giants. These dividing lines are statistical trends and do not apply universally, because there are many other factors besides metallicity that affect planet formation, including distance from star – there may be larger rocky planets that formed at larger distances. An independent reanalysis of the data suggests that there are no such dividing lines and that there is a continuum of planet formation between 1 and 4 Earth radii and no reason to suspect that the amount of solid material in a protoplanetary disk determines whether super-Earths or mini-Neptunes form. Studies done in 2016 based on over 300 planets suggest that most objects over approximately two Earth masses collect significant hydrogen–helium envelopes, meaning rocky super-Earths may be rare.

The discovery of the low-density Earth-mass planet Kepler-138d shows that there is an overlapping range of masses in which both rocky planets and low-density planets occur. A low-mass low-density planets could be an ocean planet or super-Earth with a remnant hydrogen atmosphere, or a hot planet with a steam atmosphere, or a mini-Neptune with a hydrogen–helium atmosphere. Another possibility for a low-mass low-density planet is that it has a large atmosphere made up chiefly of carbon monoxide, carbon dioxide, methane, or nitrogen.

==== Massive solid planets ====
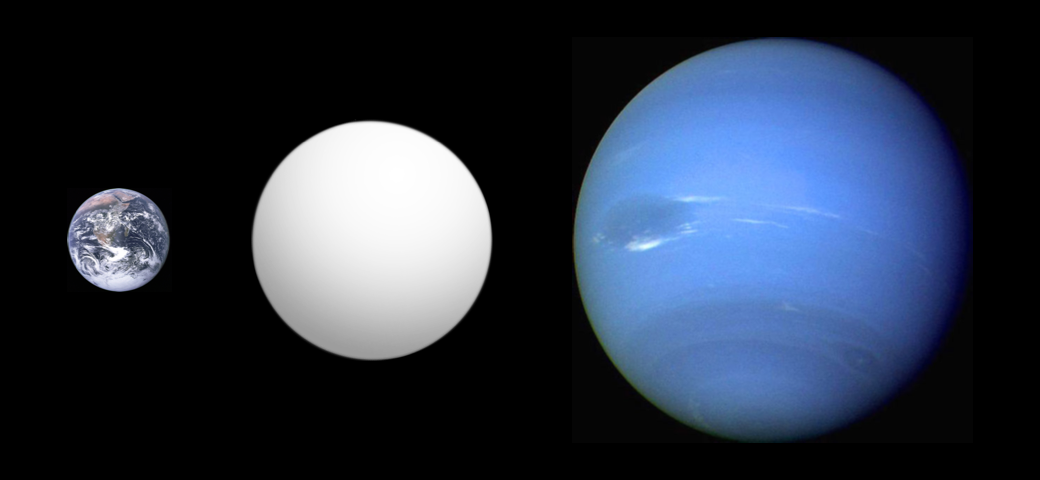
Size comparison of Kepler-10c with Earth and Neptune

In 2014, new measurements of Kepler-10c found it to be a Neptune-mass planet (17 Earth masses) with a density higher than Earth's, indicating that Kepler-10c is composed mostly of rock with possibly up to 20% high-pressure water ice but without a hydrogen-dominated envelope. Because this is well above the 10-Earth-mass upper limit that is commonly used for the term 'super-Earth', the term mega-Earth has been coined.

Gas planets can have large solid cores. The Saturn-mass planet HD 149026 b has only two-thirds of Saturn's radius, so it may have a rock–ice core of 60 Earth masses or more. CoRoT-20b has 4.24 times Jupiter's mass but a radius of only 0.84 that of Jupiter; it may have a metal core of 800 Earth masses if the heavy elements are concentrated in the core, or a core of 300 Earth masses if the heavy elements are more distributed throughout the planet.

Transit-timing variation measurements indicate that Kepler-52b, Kepler-52c and Kepler-57b have maximum masses between 30 and 100 times that of Earth, although the actual masses could be much lower. With radii about 2 Earth radii in size, they might have densities larger than that of an iron planet of the same size. They orbit very close to their stars, so they could each be the remnant core (chthonian planet) of an evaporated gas giant or brown dwarf. If a remnant core is massive enough it could remain in such a state for billions of years despite having lost the atmospheric mass.

Solid planets up to thousands of Earth masses may be able to form around massive stars (B-type and O-type stars; 5–120 solar masses), where the protoplanetary disk would contain enough heavy elements. Also, these stars have high UV radiation and winds that could photoevaporate the gas in the disk, leaving just the heavy elements. For comparison, Neptune's mass equals 17 Earth masses, Jupiter has 318 Earth masses, and the 13-Jupiter-mass limit used in the IAU's working definition of an exoplanet equals approximately 4000 Earth masses.

Cold planets have a maximum radius because adding more mass at that point causes the planet to compress under the weight instead of increasing the radius. The maximum radius for solid planets is lower than the maximum radius for gas planets.

=== Shape ===
When the size of a planet is described using its radius, this is approximating the shape by a sphere. However, the rotation of a planet causes it to be flattened at the poles; so the equatorial radius is larger than the polar radius, making it closer to an oblate spheroid. The oblateness of transiting exoplanets will affect the transit light curves. At the limits of current technology it has been possible to show that HD 189733b is less oblate than Saturn. If the planet is close to its star, then gravitational tides will elongate the planet in the direction of the star, making the planet closer to a triaxial ellipsoid. Because tidal deformation is along a line between the planet and the star, it is difficult to detect from transit photometry; it will have an effect on the transit light curves an order of magnitude less than that caused by rotational deformation even in cases where tidal deformation is larger than rotational deformation (as is the case for tidally locked hot Jupiters). Material rigidity of rocky planets and rocky cores of gas planets will cause further deviations from the aforementioned shapes. Thermal tides caused by unevenly irradiated surfaces are another factor.

== See also ==
- Detecting Earth from distant star-based systems
