= HIP 65Ab =

Hot Jupiter

Discovery
- Discovered by: L. D. Nielsen et al.
- Discovery date: July 2020 (announced)
- Detection method: Transit method

Designations
- Alternative names: CD−55° 9423b, TIC 201248411 b, TOI-129 b, TYC 8464-1200-1 b, 2MASS J00004490-5449498 b

Orbital characteristics
- Semi-major axis: 0.01782+0.00020 −0.00021 AU
- Eccentricity: 0, 0.009
- Orbital period (sidereal): 0.9809734±0.0000031 d
- Inclination: 77.18°+0.92° −1.00°
- Semi-amplitude: 753.7±5.0 m/s
- Star: HIP 65A

Physical characteristics
- Mean radius: <1.5 R_{J}
- Mass: 3.213±0.078 M_{J}, ≥2.95 M_{J}
- Mean density: 0.480+0.610 −0.260 g/cm^{3}
- Temperature: 1411±15 K (1,138 °C; 2,080 °F, equilibrium)

HIP 65Ab (TOI-129 b) is a hot Jupiter discovered in 2020 orbiting the K-type main-sequence star HIP 65A, located approximately 202 light-years (62 parsecs) distant in the southern constellation of Phoenix. It completes one orbit around its host star every 23.5 hours (0.98 days), making it an ultra-short period planet. Its radius is likely smaller than 1.5 R_{J}—another estimate of 2.03+0.61
−0.49 R_{J} is likely an overestimate.

Due to the planet's vicinity to the star, tidal interactions are slowly causing its orbit to decay. As such, the planet is expected to spiral into HIP 65A and be destroyed by its Roche limit within somewhere between 80 million years and a few billion years.

== Physical properties ==
HIP 65Ab is a massive super-Jupiter with a mass of about 3 M_{J}. Its unusually large radius of roughly 2 R_{J} is likely overestimated, caused by the grazing nature of its transit, that is to say the planet only partially transits the disc of the host star. This is also why the radius has such a large margin of error.

It orbits extremely close to its star at a distance of 0.01782 AU (2,666,000 km), or about twice the radius of the Sun. As a result, the planet receives 661 times the flux Earth does, placing its equilibrium temperature at 1,411 K (1,138 °C; 2,080 °F), just above the melting point of copper. Based on the planet's mass and temperature, HIP 65Ab is unlikely to be larger than 1.5 R_{J}. A 2024 study agrees with this, stating that the planet's true radius is close to the presented lower limit.

The characteristics of the massive planet and its 23.5-hour orbit make it a prime target for accurate atmospheric observations. Its atmosphere was analysed spectroscopically for the first time in 2024, revealing absorption lines of water and carbon monoxide. Both molecules, however, are less abundant than they would be if the planet had a Sun-like composition. The results are consistent with the planet having a sub-solar metallicity but an overabundance of carbon and oxygen. This implies the planet may have formed beyond the snow line and migrated inward after the protoplanetary disk dissipated, or alternatively that some of the oxygen has precipitated out of the atmosphere.

== Host star ==
HIP 65A is a K-type main-sequence star with the spectral type K4V, which corresponds to its effective temperature of 4590±49 K (4,320 °C; 7,800 °F). This, combined with a radius of 0.7242 R_{☉}, means that it radiates around 21% of the luminosity of the Sun from its photosphere. The star has a mass of 0.74 M_{☉}, a rotation period of 13.2 days, and an age of 4.1+4.3
−2.8 billion years. Despite its planet's low metallicity, the star itself is richer in heavy elements than the Sun with a metallicity of 0.18±0.08 dex.

It is a planetary transit variable, dimming by about 8% each time the planet passes in front of the star. This large transit depth, along with the star's high X-ray luminosity of 3.97+0.81
−0.72 erg/cm^{−2} s^{−1} make HIP 65A one of the best candidates for transit observations using X-ray telescopes.

The star is part of a wide binary system with HIP 65B, an M-type red dwarf star which has a mass of 0.3 M_{☉} and an effective temperature of 3,861 K (3,588 °C; 6,490 °F). The two stars are separated by 3.95 arcseconds in the sky as seen from Earth, which corresponds to a distance of 269 AU.
