= Kepler-10 =

Sunlike star in the constellation Draco

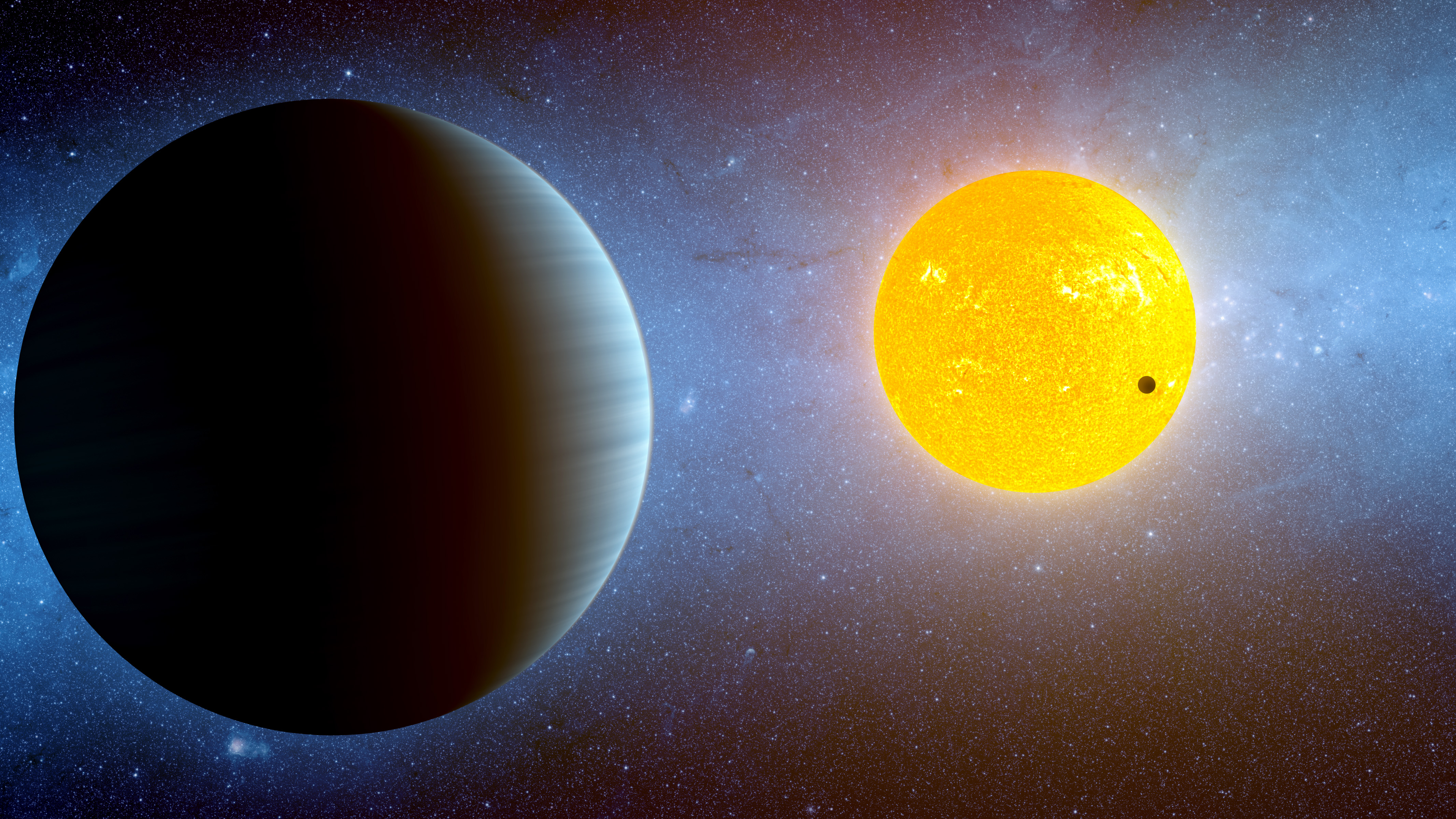
- An artist's depiction of the Kepler-10 system. Kepler-10c is in the foreground.

Observation data Epoch J2000 Equinox ICRS
- Constellation: Draco
- Right ascension: 19^{h} 02^{m} 43.06139^{s}
- Declination: +50° 14′ 28.7016″
- Apparent magnitude (V): 11.157

Characteristics
- Evolutionary stage: main sequence
- Spectral type: G2V

Astrometry
| Radial velocity (R_{v}) | −98.44±0.24 km/s |
| Proper motion (μ) | RA: −18.483 mas/yr Dec.: 41.382 mas/yr |
| Parallax (π) | 5.3698±0.0103 mas |
| Distance | 607 ± 1 ly (186.2 ± 0.4 pc) |

Details
| Mass | 0.910±0.021 M_{☉} |
| Radius | 1.065±0.009 R_{☉} |
| Luminosity | 1.13 L_{☉} |
| Surface gravity (log g) | 4.37 cgs |
| Temperature | 5708±28 K |
| Metallicity [Fe/H] | −0.15±0.04 dex |
| Rotation | 18.2 days |
| Rotational velocity (v sin i) | 7.6 km/s |
| Age | 3.7–10.6+1.5 −1.3 Gyr |

Other designations
- KOI-72, KIC 11904151, GSC 03549-00354, 2MASS J19024305+5014286

Database references
| SIMBAD | data |
| Exoplanet Archive | data |
| KIC | data |

Kepler-10, formerly known as KOI-72, is a Sun-like star in the constellation of Draco that lies 607 light-years (186 parsecs) from Earth. Kepler-10 was targeted by NASA's Kepler space telescope, as it was seen as the first star identified by the Kepler mission that could be a possible host to a small, transiting exoplanet. The star is slightly less massive, slightly larger, and slightly cooler than the Sun; at an estimated 11.9 billion years in age, Kepler-10 is 2.3 times the age of the Sun.

Kepler-10 is host to a planetary system made up of at least three planets. Kepler-10b, the first undeniably rocky planet, was discovered in its orbit after eight months of observation and announced on January 10, 2011. The planet orbits its star closely, completing an orbit every 0.8 days, and has a density similar to that of iron. The second planet, Kepler-10c, was confirmed on May 23, 2011, based on follow-up observations by the Spitzer Space Telescope. The data shows it has an orbital period of 42.3 days and has a radius more than double that of Earth, but it was initially thought to have a higher density, making it the largest and most massive rocky planet discovered as of June 2014. However, refined mass measurements have shown it to be a more typical volatile-rich planet. A third planet, Kepler-10d, was discovered in 2023 by radial velocity observations.

== Nomenclature and history ==
Kepler-10 was named because it was the tenth planetary system observed by the Kepler spacecraft, a NASA satellite designed to search for Earth-like planets that transit, or cross in front of, their host stars with respect to Earth. The transit slightly dims the host star; this periodic dimming effect is then noted by Kepler. After eight months of observation ranging from May 2009 to January 2010, the Kepler team established Kepler-10b as the first rocky exoplanet discovered by the Kepler satellite. Kepler-10 was the first Kepler-targeted star suspected of having a small planet in orbit. Because of that, verifying Kepler's discovery was prioritized by telescopes at the W.M. Keck Observatory in Hawaii. The discovery was successfully verified. Although there had been many potentially rocky exoplanets discovered in the past, Kepler-10b was the first definitively rocky planet to have been discovered.

The discovery of Kepler-10b was announced to the public at a winter meeting of the American Astronomical Society on January 10, 2011, in Seattle. On May 23, 2011, the existence of Kepler-10c was confirmed at the 218th AAS meeting in Boston.

== Characteristics ==
Kepler-10 is a G-type star, like the Sun. With a mass of 0.895 (± 0.06) M_{sun} and a radius of 1.056 (± 0.021) R_{sun}, the star is approximately 10% less massive than and 5% wider than the Sun. The metallicity of Kepler-10, as measured in [Fe/H] (the amount of iron in the star), is -0.15 (± 0.04); this means that Kepler-10 is about 70% as metal-rich as the Sun. Metallicity tends to play a large role in the formation of planets, determining if they form, and what kind of planet they will form. In addition, Kepler-10 is estimated to be 11.9 billion years old and to have an effective temperature of 5627 (± 44) K; To compare, the Sun is younger and hotter, with an age of 4.6 billion years and an effective temperature of 5778 K.

Kepler-10 is located at a distance of 186 parsecs from the Earth, which equates to approximately 607 light years. Also, Kepler-10's apparent magnitude, or brightness as seen from Earth, is 10.96; it therefore cannot be seen with the naked eye.

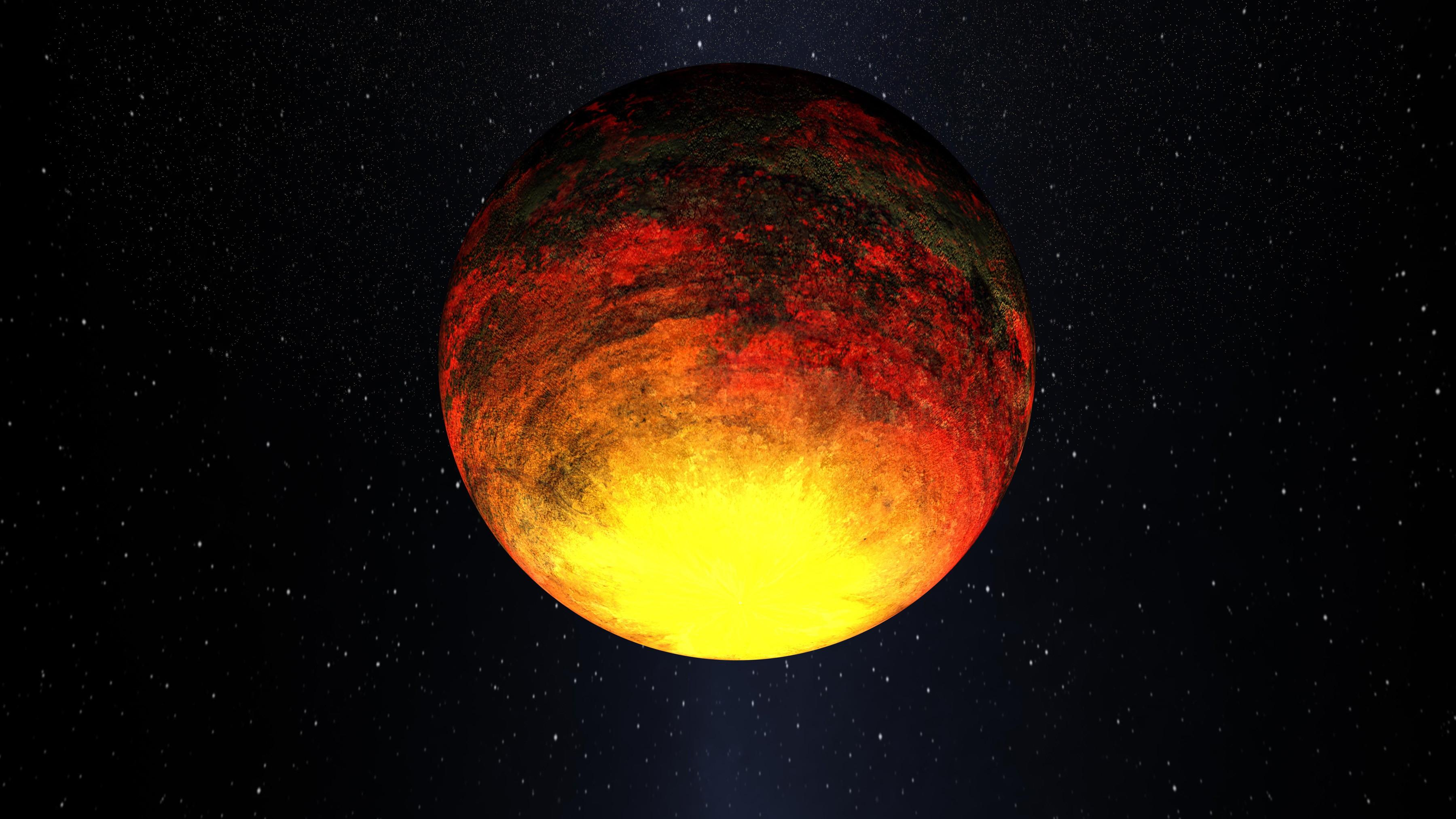
An artist's impression of planet Kepler-10b.

== Planetary system ==
Per the usual exoplanet nomenclature, the first planet discovered to be orbiting Kepler-10 is called Kepler-10b. Announced in 2011, it was the first definitely rocky planet identified outside the Solar System. The planet has a mass that is 3.33±0.49 times that of Earth's and a radius that is 1.47^{+0.03}_{−0.02} times that of Earth. The planet orbits Kepler-10 at a distance of 0.01684 AU every 0.8375 days; this can be compared to the orbit and orbital period of planet Mercury, which circles the Sun at a distance of 0.3871 AU every 87.97 days. Because the planet orbits so closely to its star, its eccentricity is virtually zero. It, thus, has an extremely circular orbit.

Kepler-10c was also discovered by NASA's Kepler Mission, the second exoplanet found to orbit Kepler-10. Radial-velocity measurements of the body initially suggested that it has a mass of 17.2±1.9 Earth masses and a radius of 2.35 Earth radii, which would have made it the largest known rocky planet as of 2014. Kepler-10c would orbit Kepler-10 at a distance of 0.24 AU every 45.29 days. However, in July 2017, more careful analysis of HARPS-N and HIRES data showed that Kepler-10c was much less massive than originally thought, instead around 7.37+1.32
−1.19 M_{🜨} with a mean density of 3.14 g/cm^{3}. Instead of a primarily rocky composition, the more accurately determined mass of Kepler-10c suggests a world made almost entirely of volatiles, mainly water.

A candidate third planet with an orbital period of about 102 days, given the provisional designation KOI-72.X, was identified in 2016 based on transit-timing variations. In 2023, the presence of a third planet, Kepler-10d, was confirmed by radial velocity observations. It has an orbital period of 151 days and a minimum mass about 13 times that of Earth.

The Kepler-10 planetary system (Note: All masses, eccentricies, Kepler-10d's orbital period and Kepler-10c's inclination are from Bonomo et al. (2025), the remaining from Bonomo et al. (2023).)
| Companion (in order from star) | Mass | Semimajor axis (AU) | Orbital period (days) | Eccentricity | Inclination (°) | Radius |
|---|---|---|---|---|---|---|
| b | 3.24±0.32 M_{🜨} | 0.01685±0.00013 | 0.8374907±0.0000002 | 0 | 84.8+3.2 −3.9 | 1.470+0.030 −0.020 R_{🜨} |
| c | 11.29±1.24 M_{🜨} | 0.2410±0.0019 | 45.294301±0.000048 | 0.121+0.035 −0.018 | 89.623±0.011 | 2.355±0.022 R_{🜨} |
| d | ≥13.00+0.73 −2.44 M_{🜨} | 0.5379±0.0044 | 151.09+0.18 −0.41 | 0.190+0.027 −0.070 | — | — |

== See also ==
- Kepler Mission
- List of exoplanets
