= WASP-43b =

Extrasolar planet in the constellation Sextans

WASP-43b / Astrolábos
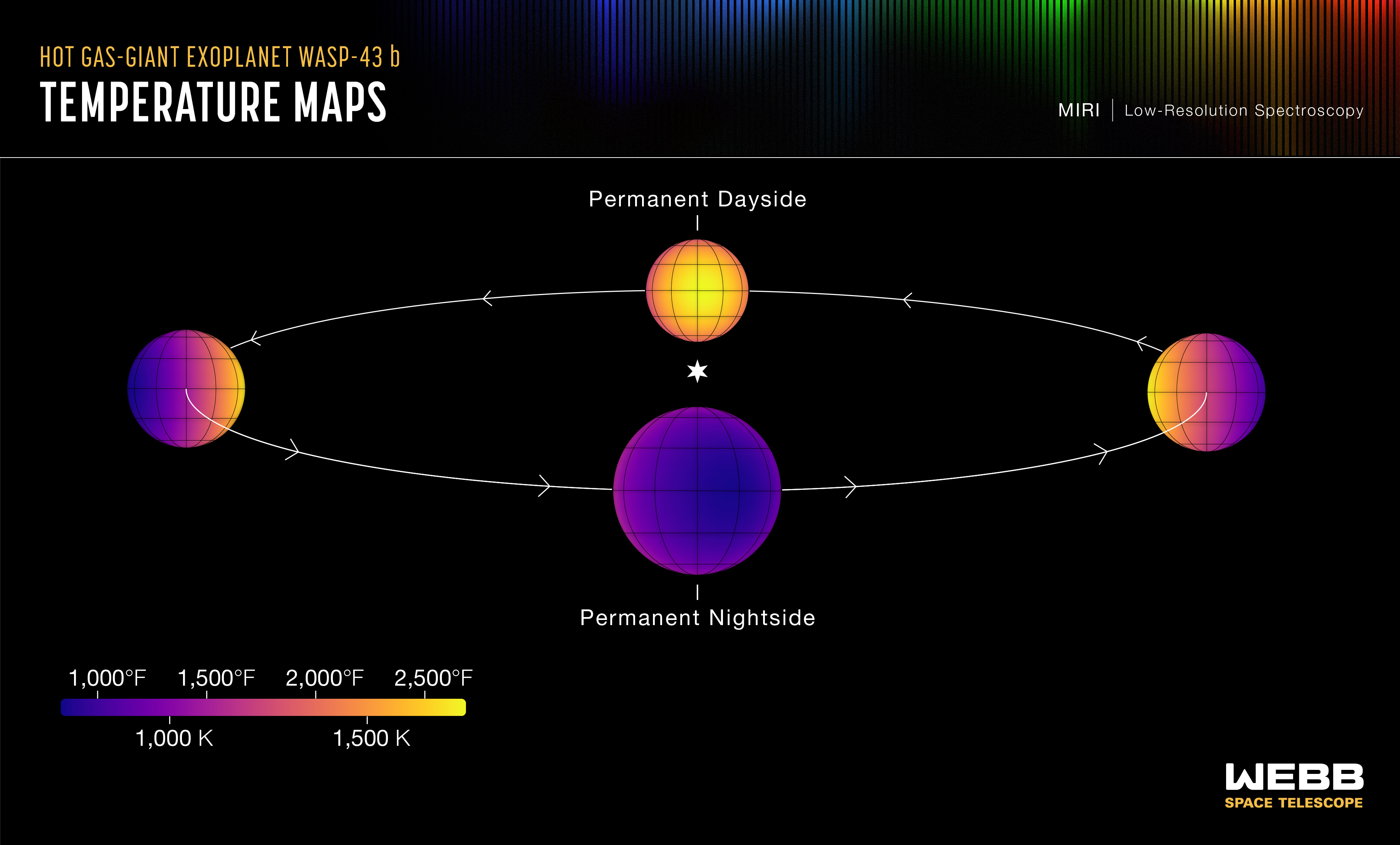
- Temperature map of WASP-43b

Discovery
- Discovered by: Coel Hellier et al.
- Discovery site: La Silla Observatory / South African Astronomical Observatory
- Discovery date: Published April 15, 2011
- Detection method: transit method (secondary occultation detected later)

Designations
- Alternative names: Astrolábos

Orbital characteristics
- Semi-major axis: 0.01526 (± 0.00018) AU
- Eccentricity: < 0.0298
- Orbital period (sidereal): 0.81347753 (± 0.00000071) d
- Inclination: 82.33 (± 0.20)
- Star: WASP-43

Physical characteristics
- Mean radius: 1.04 ^{+0.07}_{−0.09} R_{J}
- Mass: 2.03 (± 0.1) M_{J}
- Albedo: <0.06
- Temperature: 1479±13 K (1,206 °C; 2,203 °F, dayside); 755±46 K (482 °C; 899 °F, nightside)

WASP-43b, formally named Astrolábos, is a transiting planet in orbit around the young, active, and low-mass star WASP-43 in the constellation Sextans. The planet is a hot Jupiter with a mass twice that of Jupiter, but with a roughly equal radius. WASP-43b was flagged as a candidate by the SuperWASP program, before they conducted follow-ups using instruments at La Silla Observatory in Chile, which confirmed its existence and provided orbital and physical characteristics. The planet's discovery was published on April 14, 2011.

WASP-43b has an orbital period of approximately 0.8 days (19.2 hours), which at the time of discovery was the third-shortest known, surpassed only by WASP-19b and WASP-47e. At the time of its discovery, the size of WASP-43b's orbit was the smallest known for a hot Jupiter, probably due to its host star's low mass.

== Nomenclature ==
In August 2022, this planet and its host star were included among 20 systems to be named by the third NameExoWorlds project. The approved names, proposed by a team from Romania, were announced in June 2023. WASP-43b is named Astrolábos and its host star is named Gnomon, after the gnomon and the Greek word for the astrolabe.

== Observational history ==
WASP-43 was first flagged as host to a potential transiting event (when a body crosses in front of and dims its host star) by data collected by SuperWASP, a British organization working to discover transiting planets across the entirety of the sky. In particular, WASP-43 was observed first by the leg of WASP-South at the South African Astronomical Observatory between January and May 2009.

Later observation by both SuperWASPs in the Northern and Southern Hemispheres led to the collection of 13,768 data points between January and May 2010 and to the use of the CORALIE spectrograph at La Silla Observatory in Chile. Fourteen measurements using the radial velocity method confirmed WASP-43b as a planet, revealing its mass in the process. The use of La Silla's TRAPPIST telescope helped the science team working on the planet to create a light curve of the planet's transit in December 2010.

The initial discovery was published in the journal Astronomy and Astrophysics in 2011. This was followed by reporting of a second transit in 2014, and a full observation of the phases of the planet later that year.

== Host star ==
WASP-43 is a K-type star in the Sextans constellation that is about 80 parsecs (261 light years) away. The star has a mass 0.58 times that of the Sun, but is more diffuse, with a radius 0.93 times that of the Sun. The star's effective temperature is 4,400 K, making the star cooler than the Sun, and is metal-poor with regards to the Sun because it has a metallicity of [Fe/H] = −0.05 (89% the amount of iron in the Sun). The star is young, and is estimated to be 598 million years old (as compared to the Sun's 4.6 billion years). Analysis of emission lines indicate that WASP-43 is an active star.

WASP-43 has one detected planet in its orbit, WASP-43b. The star has an apparent magnitude of 12.4, and thus is too faint to be seen with the unaided eye from Earth.

== Characteristics ==
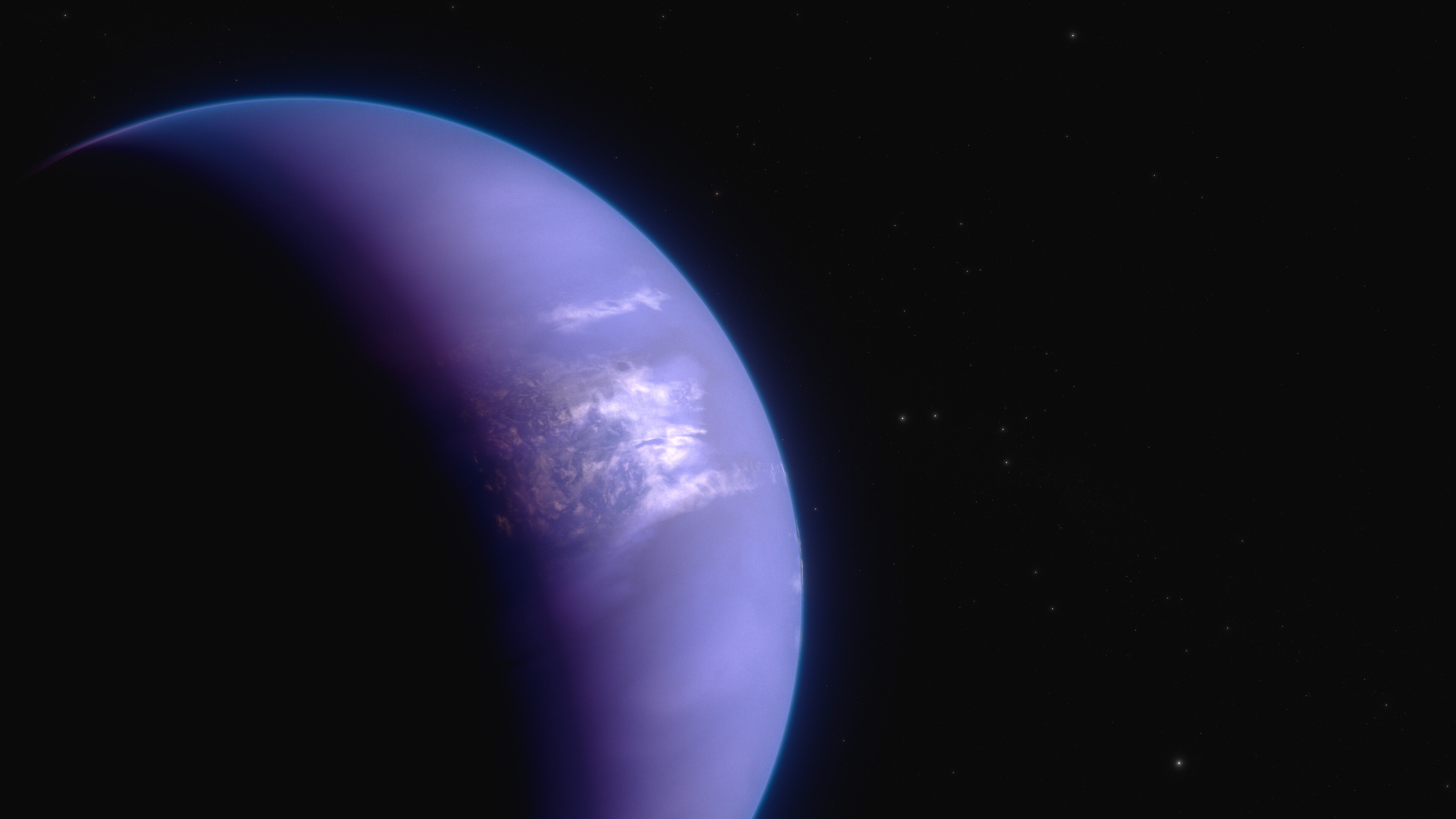
Artist's concept of WASP-43b

WASP-43b is a dense hot Jupiter with a mass 2.05 times the mass of Jupiter, but a radius 1.036 times that of Jupiter's. The planet orbits its host star at a mean distance of 0.01526 AU every 0.813478 days (19.5235 hours); this orbital period, at the time of WASP-43b's discovery, was the second-shortest orbit yet detected, surpassed only by WASP-19b. In comparison, Mercury has an orbital period of 87.97 days and lies at a mean distance of 0.387 AU from the Sun. In addition, WASP-43b had the closest orbit to its host star (among hot Jupiters) at the time of its discovery, comparable only to the super-Earth planet GJ 1214 b and to the planetary candidate orbiting KOI-961 (confirmed a year later as Kepler-42). While hot Jupiters are known to have small orbital periods, planets with exceptionally small periods below three or four days are extremely rare; however, in the case of WASP-43b, the planet's proximity can be explained because its host star has a very low mass. The rarity of systems like that of WASP-43 and its planet suggest that hot Jupiters do not usually occur around low-mass stars, or that such planets cannot maintain stable orbits around such stars.

WASP-43b, along with the planets WASP-19b and WASP-18b, conflicted with currently accepted models of tidal movements derived from observations of the orbits of binary star systems. Revisions to the model with regard to planets were proposed to help the models conform to the orbital parameters of these planets. No orbital decay driven by tidal dissipation was detected in 2016, placing a lower limit of 10 million years on the remaining planetary lifetime. Updated orbital period measurements have failed to detect orbital decay as of 2021.

== Atmosphere ==
In 2019, the spectrum of WASP-43b was taken, with the best fit being water-containing clouds without significant amounts of alkali metals. In 2020, further analysis of the spectra revealed the presence of bivalent aluminum oxide (AlO) and water in the atmosphere, while carbon monoxide, carbon dioxide and methane were not detected. Climate modelling suggests the carbon monoxide concentration may be variable, while the atmospheric spectrum of WASP-43b is dominated by clouds made of refractory mineral particles, with a small contribution from hydrocarbon haze. Carbon to oxygen ratio in the planet (0.75±0.15) is elevated compared to the Solar ratio of 0.55. The planet is very dark overall, with no clouds on the dayside and an albedo below 0.06. In 2024, the James Webb Space Telescope observed that the skies are clear on the day side and is cloudy on its night side, with winds of 5,000 miles per hour.

There is a large difference in temperature between dayside (1479±13 K) and nightside (755±46 K).
