= Kepler-78 =

Binary star in the constellation Cygnus

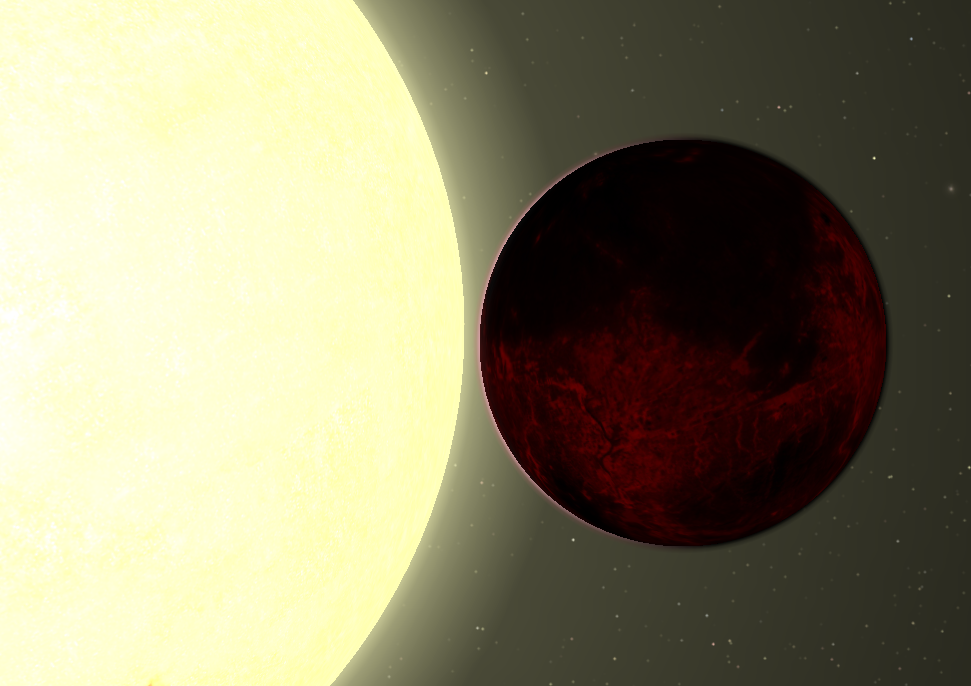
- Artist's impression of the planet Kepler-78b around Kepler-78

Observation data Epoch J2000 Equinox ICRS
- Constellation: Cygnus
- Right ascension: 19^{h} 34^{m} 58.01374^{s}
- Declination: +44° 26′ 53.9602″
- Apparent magnitude (V): 11.72

Characteristics
- Evolutionary stage: main sequence
- Spectral type: K2.5V

Astrometry
Proper motion (μ)	RA: +38.195 mas/yr Dec.: −16.309 mas/yr
Parallax (π)	8.0085±0.0104 mas
Distance	407.3 ± 0.5 ly (124.9 ± 0.2 pc)

Details
Mass	0.779+0.032 −0.046 M_{☉}
Radius	0.7475+0.0077 −0.0078 R_{☉}
Luminosity	0.31 L_{☉}
Surface gravity (log g)	4.51 cgs
Temperature	5,058±50 K
Metallicity [Fe/H]	−0.18±0.08 dex
Rotation	12.53 days
Rotational velocity (v sin i)	3.1 km/s
Age	240 Myr

Other designations
- Kepler-78, KIC 8435766, TYC 3147-188-1, 2MASS J19345800+4426539

Database references
SIMBAD	data
KIC	data

Kepler-78 (formerly known as KIC 8435766) is a 12th magnitude star 407 light-years (125 parsecs) away in the constellation Cygnus. Initially classified as an eclipsing binary with orbital period 0.710015 days, it was later re-classified as a single star with significant interaction between star magnetosphere and close-in planet. The radius of the star is of about 74% of the Sun, and the effective temperature is about 5,100 K.

== Planetary system ==
The Kepler-78 planetary system is composed of one known planet called Kepler-78b, a planet slightly bigger than Earth with an extremely close orbit to the parent star. The orbital period of this planet is about 8.5 hours because of its proximity to its star. While it has a similar density to the Earth (at 5.57 g/cm^{3}), its surface temperature is about 1300 to 1500 K.

The Kepler-78 planetary system
Companion (in order from star)	Mass	Semimajor axis (AU)	Orbital period (days)	Eccentricity	Inclination (°)	Radius
b	1.68±0.27 M_{🜨}	0.00901+0.00012 −0.00019	0.35500745±0.00000008	0	75.2+2.6 −2.1	1.201±0.028 R_{🜨}
