= WASP-43 =

Star in the constellation Sextans

WASP-43 / Gnomon
Observation data Epoch J2000 Equinox ICRS
- Constellation: Sextans
- Right ascension: 10^{h} 19^{m} 38.00889^{s}
- Declination: −09° 48′ 22.6058″
- Apparent magnitude (V): 12.46

Characteristics
- Evolutionary stage: main sequence
- Spectral type: K7V

Astrometry
Radial velocity (R_{v})	−3.42±0.55 km/s
Proper motion (μ)	RA: −41.992(18) mas/yr Dec.: −38.004(18) mas/yr
Parallax (π)	11.4740±0.0163 mas
Distance	284.3 ± 0.4 ly (87.2 ± 0.1 pc)

Details
Mass	0.723^{+0.028}_{−0.031} M_{☉}
Radius	0.6506±0.0054 R_{☉}
Surface gravity (log g)	4.639±0.01 cgs
Temperature	4286^{+34}_{−40} K
Metallicity [Fe/H]	−0.01±0.15 dex
Rotation	15.6±0.4 d
Rotational velocity (v sin i)	2.26±0.54 km/s
Age	7±7 Gyr

Other designations
- Gnomon, TOI-656, TIC 36734222, WASP-43, GSC 05490-00141, 2MASS J10193800-0948225

Database references
SIMBAD	data
Exoplanet Archive	data

WASP-43, also named Gnomon, is a K-type star about 284 light-years (87 parsecs) away in the constellation Sextans. It is about half the size of the Sun, and has approximately half the mass. WASP-43 has one known planet in orbit, a hot Jupiter called WASP-43b. At the time of publishing of WASP-43b's discovery on April 15, 2011, the planet was the most closely orbiting hot Jupiter discovered. The small orbit of WASP-43b is thought to be caused by WASP-43's unusually low mass. WASP-43 was first observed between January and May 2009 by the SuperWASP project, and was found to be cooler and slightly richer in metals than the Sun. WASP-43 has also been found to be an active star that rotates at a high velocity.

== Nomenclature ==
The designation WASP-43 indicates that this was the 43rd star found to have a planet by the Wide Angle Search for Planets.

In August 2022, this planetary system was included among 20 systems to be named by the third NameExoWorlds project. The approved names, proposed by a team from Romania, were announced in June 2023. WASP-43 is named Gnomon and its planet is named Astrolábos, after the gnomon and the Greek word for the astrolabe.

== Observational history ==
WASP-43 was first observed by the WASP-South part of the planet-searching SuperWASP project between January and May 2009. It was determined from the collected data that WASP-43 could potentially host a planet that transited, or crossed in front of, its host star as seen from Earth. Later observations by both the WASP-South and SuperWASP-North sections of SuperWASP between January and May 2010 yielded a total of 13,768 data points.

Scientists interpreted that a 0.81-day orbit of a possible planet from the data, and followed up with observations using the CORALIE spectrograph on the Leonhard Euler Telescope at Chile's La Silla Observatory. CORALIE provided radial velocity measurements that indicated that WASP-43 was being transited by a planet that was 1.8 times Jupiter's mass, now dubbed WASP-43b. Another follow-up using the TRAPPIST telescope further defined the light curve of the body transiting WASP-43.

WASP-43b's discovery was reported on April 15, 2011 in the journal Astronomy and Astrophysics.

== Characteristics ==
WASP-43 is a K-type star with a mass that is 0.72 times that of the Sun, and a radius that is 0.67 times that of the Sun. With an effective temperature of 4400 K, WASP-43 is cooler than the Sun. It also has slightly lower quantities of iron than the Sun, with a measured metallicity of [Fe/H] = -0.05 (89% of that measured in the Sun). However, in general, the star has a slightly larger quantity of metals than the Sun. A notable exception is lithium, which is not present in WASP-43's spectrum. However, the star's spectrum also indicates that WASP-43 is an active star. WASP-43 has been found to rotate quickly, although the exact mechanism that causes such speed in this rotation is uncertain, it may be possible that this is caused by tidal interactions between WASP-43 and its planet.

With an apparent magnitude of 12.5, WASP-43 cannot be seen with the unaided eye. The star is located approximately 87 parsecs (280 light-years) away from Earth.

== Planetary system ==
WASP-43b is a hot Jupiter with a mass that is 1.78 times the mass of Jupiter and a radius that is 0.93 times Jupiter's radius. WASP-43b orbits its host star every 0.813475 days (19.5234 hours) at a distance of 0.015 AU, the closest orbit yet found at the time of WASP-43b's discovery. WASP-43's unusually low mass accounts for WASP-43b's small orbit. Because planets with orbits around stars like WASP-43 are not usually observed, models either suggest that planets like WASP-43b are either uncommon or have short lifetimes caused by a decay in their orbits. WASP-43b has a density of 2.20 g/cm^{3}.

The WASP-43 planetary system
Companion (in order from star)	Mass	Semimajor axis (AU)	Orbital period (days)	Eccentricity	Inclination (°)	Radius
b / Astrolábos	2.054^{+0.055}_{−0.060} M_{J}	0.01504(29)	0.813473978(35)	<0.0062	82.109±0.088	1.049^{+0.014}_{−0.016} R_{J}
