= Kepler-10c =

Exoplanet in the constellation Draco

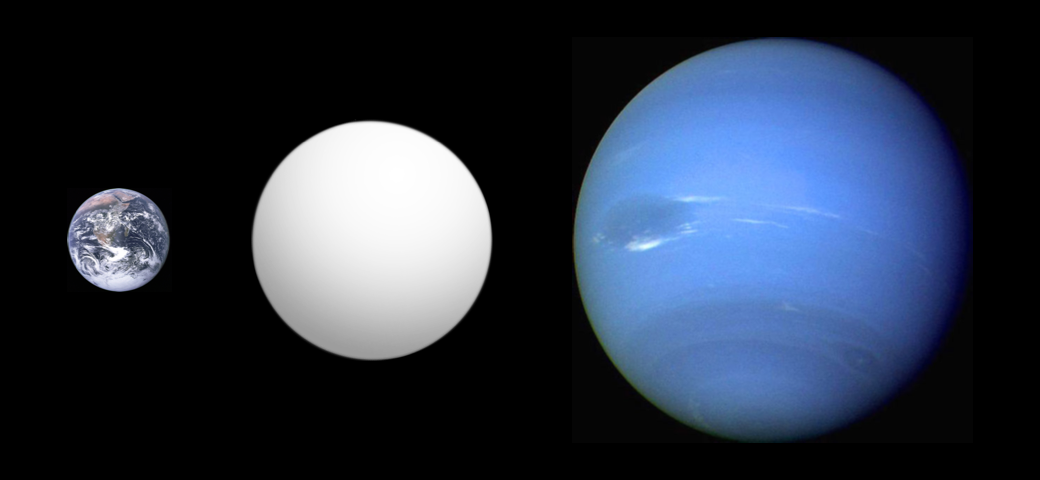
- Size comparison of Kepler-10c with Earth and Neptune

Discovery
- Discovery date: Announced May 23, 2011
- Detection method: Transit (Kepler Mission)

Orbital characteristics
- Semi-major axis: 0.2407^{+0.0044}_{−0.0053} AU
- Orbital period (sidereal): 45.29485^{+0.00065}_{−0.00076} d
- Inclination: 89.65^{+0.09}_{−0.12}
- Star: Kepler-10

Physical characteristics
- Mean radius: 2.35^{+0.09}_{−0.04} R_{🜨}
- Mass: 7.37 ^{+1.32}_{−1.19} M_{🜨}
- Mean density: 3.14 ^{+0.63}_{−0.55} g cm^{−3}
- Temperature: T_{eq}: 584 ^{+54}_{−17} K

Kepler-10c is an exoplanet orbiting the G-type star Kepler-10, located around 608 light-years away in Draco. Its discovery was announced by the Kepler space telescope team in May 2011, although it had been seen as a planetary candidate since January 2011, when Kepler-10b was discovered. The team confirmed the observation using data from NASA's Spitzer Space Telescope and a technique called BLENDER that ruled out most false positives. Kepler-10c was the third transiting planet to be confirmed statistically (based on probability rather than actual observation), after Kepler-9d and Kepler-11g. The Kepler team considers the statistical method that led to the discovery of Kepler-10c as what will be necessary to confirm many planets in Kepler's field of view.

Kepler-10c orbits its host star every forty-five days at a quarter of the average distance between the Sun and Earth. Initial observations showed that it has a radius more than double that of Earth, and suggested a higher density, suggesting a mainly rocky composition with around 5–20% ices by mass. For comparison, the Earth's oceans represent only 0.02% of the Earth's entire mass, with an additional amount potentially a few times this stored in the mantle. However, in 2017, more careful analysis using both HARPS and HIRES data revealed that Kepler-10c is not a large terrestrial planet, but instead a typical volatile-rich planet of about seven Earth masses.

== Discovery and confirmation ==
In January 2011, the closely orbiting planet Kepler-10b was confirmed in the orbit of the star Kepler-10 after measurements of its transiting behavior (where it crosses in front of Kepler-10, periodically dimming it) and a radial velocity effect detected in Kepler-10's spectrum provided the information needed to prove that it was indeed a planet. An additional, longer-period dimming was detected in Kepler-10's spectrum, suggesting that a second planet existed in the system; however, there remained the possibility that this signal could have some other cause, and that the transit event was a false positive. Attempts to measure the radial velocity effects of this object, then named KOI 072.02, were fruitless; therefore, to rule out false positive scenarios, the Kepler team used a technique called BLENDER.

The application of BLENDER was supplemented by use of the IRAC instrument on the Spitzer Space Telescope, which was used on August 30 and November 15, 2010, to further define Kepler-10's light curve at the point where KOI 072.02 appeared to transit it. It was found that the transiting object did not produce a color, an aspect that is characteristic of stars. This suggested even further that KOI 072.02 was a planet. In addition, the IRAC instrument found no difference in the transit signal when comparing the star's light curve in the infrared and in visible light; stars that are aligned with Kepler-10 might appear visibly similar, but would appear different in the infrared.

The WIYN Observatory's 3.5m telescope was used for speckle imaging on June 18, 2010; in addition, the PHARO camera on the Palomar Observatory's 5m telescope was used for its adaptive optics capabilities. These observations, combined with observations of Kepler-10's spectrum taken from the W.M. Keck Observatory, ruled out the possibility that a nearby star's light was corrupting the observed spectrum of Kepler-10 and creating the results that had led astronomers to believe that a second planet existed in Kepler-10's orbit. All of these possibilities, with the exception of if such a star existed exactly behind or in front of Kepler-10, were effectively ruled out; even with this, the Kepler team found that if a star was indeed aligned with Kepler-10 as seen from Earth, such a star would probably not be a giant star.

With a greater degree of certainty established, the Kepler team compared the models formed using BLENDER to the photometric observations collected by the Kepler satellite. The BLENDER technique allowed the Kepler team to rule out the majority of the alternatives including, notably, that of triple star systems. BLENDER then allowed the Kepler team to determine that although all models representing hierarchical triple stars (a binary system between a single star and a double star) can resemble the light curve of Kepler-10, the aforementioned follow-up observations would have detected them all. The only possible blends remaining after ruling out hierarchical triple stars was that of determining if the curve is caused by interference from a background star, or if it is indeed caused by the orbit of a transiting planet.

Comparisons of KOI 072.02 to the 1235 other Kepler Objects of Interest in Kepler's field of vision allowed astronomers to use models that led to the confirmation of KOI 072.02 as a planet with a high degree of certainty. KOI 072.02 was then renamed Kepler-10c. The planet's confirmation was announced at the Boston meeting of the American Astronomical Society on May 23, 2011.

Kepler-10c was the first Kepler target to be observed using Spitzer with the hope of detecting a shallow transit dip in a light curve. At the time of Kepler-10c's discovery, Spitzer was the only facility capable of detecting shallow transits in the Kepler data to an extent at which the data could be meaningfully analyzed. The planet was also the third transiting planet that was validated through an analysis of statistical data (rather than actual observation), after the planets Kepler-9d and Kepler-11g. In Kepler-10c's confirmation paper, the Kepler team discussed how a large fraction of planets in Kepler's field of view would be confirmed in this statistical manner.

== Host star ==
Kepler-10 is a G-type star located 187 parsecs (608 light years) from Earth. It is 0.895 solar masses and 1.056 solar radii, making it slightly less massive than the Sun, but approximately the same size.

With an effective temperature of 5627 K, Kepler-10 is cooler than the Sun. The star is also metal-poor and far older: its metallicity is measured at [Fe/H] = −0.15 (29% less iron than in the Earth's Sun). Kepler-10 has a measured age of approximately 10.6 billion years.

Kepler-10 has an apparent magnitude of 11.2, which means that the star is invisible to the naked eye on Earth.

== Characteristics ==
Kepler-10c is the outer one of the two known planets of Kepler-10, completing one orbit of the star every 45.29485 days at a distance of 0.2407 AU. The inner planet, Kepler-10b, is a rocky planet that orbits every ~0.8 days at a distance of 0.01684 AU. Kepler-10c's equilibrium temperature is estimated at 584 K, almost four times hotter than Jupiter's. The planet's orbital inclination is 89.65º, or almost edge-on with respect to Earth and to Kepler-10. Transits have been observed at points where Kepler-10c has crossed in front of its host star.

Kepler-10c was originally thought to have a mass of 15–19 Earth masses. With a radius only 2.35 (2.31 to 2.44) times that of Earth (and so a volume 12–15 times that of Earth), it was believed to be unlikely to contain significant amounts of hydrogen or helium gas, since an outgassed or accreted hydrogen-rich atmosphere would have been lost over the 10.6-billion-year lifetime of the Kepler-10 system. Instead, the composition was believed to be mainly rocky, with a water fraction of 5–20% by mass. The bulk of this water was thought to be likely in the form of high-pressure "hot-ice" phases. However, in July 2017, more careful analysis of HARPS-N and HIRES data showed that Kepler-10c was much less massive than originally thought, instead around 7.37 (6.18 to 8.69) M_{🜨} with a mean density of 3.14 g/cm^{3}. Instead of a primarily rocky composition, the more accurately determined mass of Kepler-10c suggests a world made almost entirely of volatiles, mainly water.

== See also ==
- 55 Cancri e
- Kepler-10b
- Kepler-20b
- Mega-Earth, a proposed class of exoplanet originally including Kepler-10c
