= Iron planet =

Type of terrestrial planet

Comparison of sizes of planets with different compositions

An iron planet is a type of planet that consists primarily of an iron-rich core with little or no mantle. Mercury is the largest celestial body of this type in the Solar System (as the other terrestrial planets are silicate planets), but larger iron-rich exoplanets are called super-Mercuries.

Iron is the sixth most abundant element in the universe by mass after hydrogen, helium, oxygen, carbon, and neon.

== Origin ==
Iron-rich planets may be the remnants of normal metal/silicate rocky planets whose rocky mantles were stripped away by giant impacts. Some are thought to consist of diamond fields. Current planet formation models predict iron-rich planets will form in close-in orbits or orbiting massive stars where the protoplanetary disk presumably consists of iron-rich material.

== Characteristics ==
Iron-rich planets are smaller and denser than other types of planets of comparable mass. Such planets would have no plate tectonics or strong magnetic field as they cool rapidly after formation. These planets are not like Earth. Since water and iron are unstable over geological timescales, wet iron planets in the goldilocks zone may be covered by lakes of iron carbonyl and other exotic volatiles rather than water.

In science fiction, such a planet has been called a "Cannonball".

== Candidates ==
An extrasolar planet candidate that may be composed mainly of iron is Kepler-974b.

A super-Mercury candidate is GJ 367b.

The star HD 23472 is orbited by two super-Mercuries.

HD 137496 b is a dense hot super-Mercury.

LHS 3844 b is potentially an Fe-rich super-Mercury.

== See also ==
- Dwarf planet
- Extrasolar planet
- Terrestrial planet
