= Kepler-78b =

Terrestrial lava planet orbiting Kepler-78

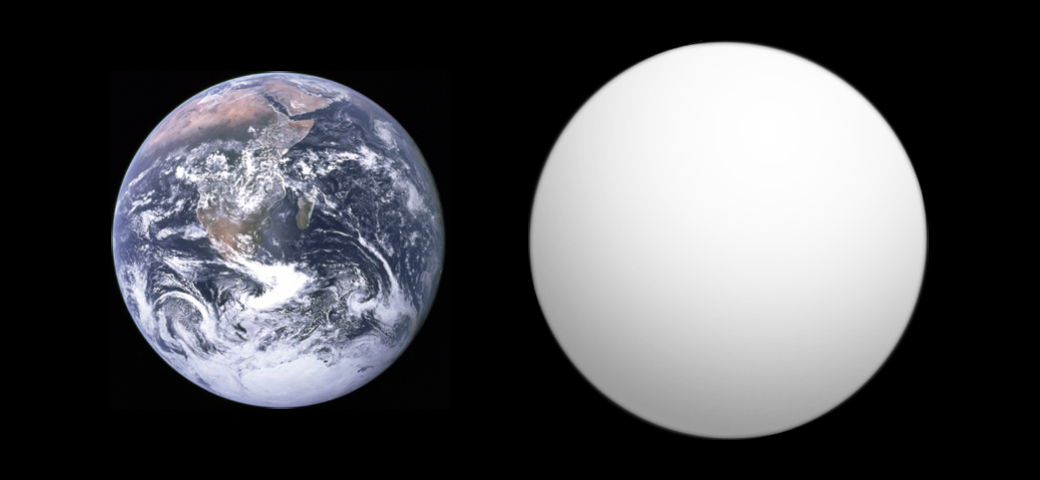
- Size comparison of Kepler-78b with Earth

Discovery
- Discovery date: November 5, 2013
- Detection method: Transit and reflection/emission modulations (Kepler Mission)

Designations
- Alternative names: KIC 8435766 b

Orbital characteristics
- Semi-major axis: 0.00901+0.00012 −0.00019 AU
- Eccentricity: 0
- Orbital period (sidereal): 0.35500745(8) days (8.5 hours)
- Inclination: 75.2°+2.6° −2.1°
- Star: Kepler-78

Physical characteristics
- Mean radius: 1.228+0.018 −0.019 R_{🜨}
- Mass: 1.68±0.27 M_{🜨}
- Mean density: 5.33+0.97 −0.33 g/cm^{3}
- Surface gravity: log g = 3.058+0.069 −0.080 cgs (1.16 g)
- Temperature: 2223±32 K (1,950 °C, 3,542 °F)

Kepler-78b (formerly known as KIC 8435766 b) is an exoplanet orbiting around the star Kepler-78. At the time of its discovery, it was the exoplanet most similar to Earth in terms of mass, radius, and mean density.

== Discovery ==
Kepler-78b is the only planet to be found orbiting the star KIC 8435766, now known as Kepler-78. The planet was discovered in 2013 by analyzing data from the Kepler space telescope. The planet was detected as it passed across the surface of its host star, as viewed from Earth. It was also found by the effects of occultation as it passed behind the star. Reflected light from the parent star due to orbital phases was also detected. It was not at first designated as a Kepler object of interest, as data analysis failed to identify it due to its short orbital period.

== Characteristics ==
=== Size, mass, and composition ===
At the time of its discovery, Kepler-78b was the exoplanet most similar to Earth in terms of mass, radius, and mean density. The planet is approximately 1.69 times the mass and 1.12 times the radius of Earth. The acceleration due to gravity on the planet's surface is about 11 m/s^{2} (25 mph/s), slightly greater than Earth's surface gravity. Two independent teams were involved in pioneering work to estimate the planet's mass. Their estimates were made possible because Kepler-78b's gravity causes a "wobble" in the orbit of the host star. While the method has been used to characterize gas giants, it is difficult to estimate the mass of Earth-sized exoplanets, because their gravity is too weak to produce a visible influence. In this case, the planet's orbit is close enough to its star to produce a detectable effect.

One team, led by Francesco Pepe, used the High Accuracy Radial Velocity Planet Searcher-North (HARPS-N) spectrograph at the Telescopio Nazionale Galileo in the Canary Islands to estimate that the planet has a mass 1.86 times that of the Earth and a radius 1.16 times greater. The other, led by Andrew Howard of the University of Hawaii at Manoa, used data from the High Resolution Eschelle Spectrometer at the W.M. Keck Observatory in Hawaii to estimate the mass as 1.69 times that of the Earth and the radius as 1.12 times larger. Both estimates put the planet's density at about 5.5 grams per cubic centimeter (0.20 pounds per cubic inch), equivalent to Earth's density. This measurement is possibly indicative of a rock-iron composition like Earth's. The iron core could build up to 40% of the planet mass.

Kepler-78b is most similar to larger high-density, hot exoplanets like Kepler-10b, Kepler-36b and CoRoT-7b.

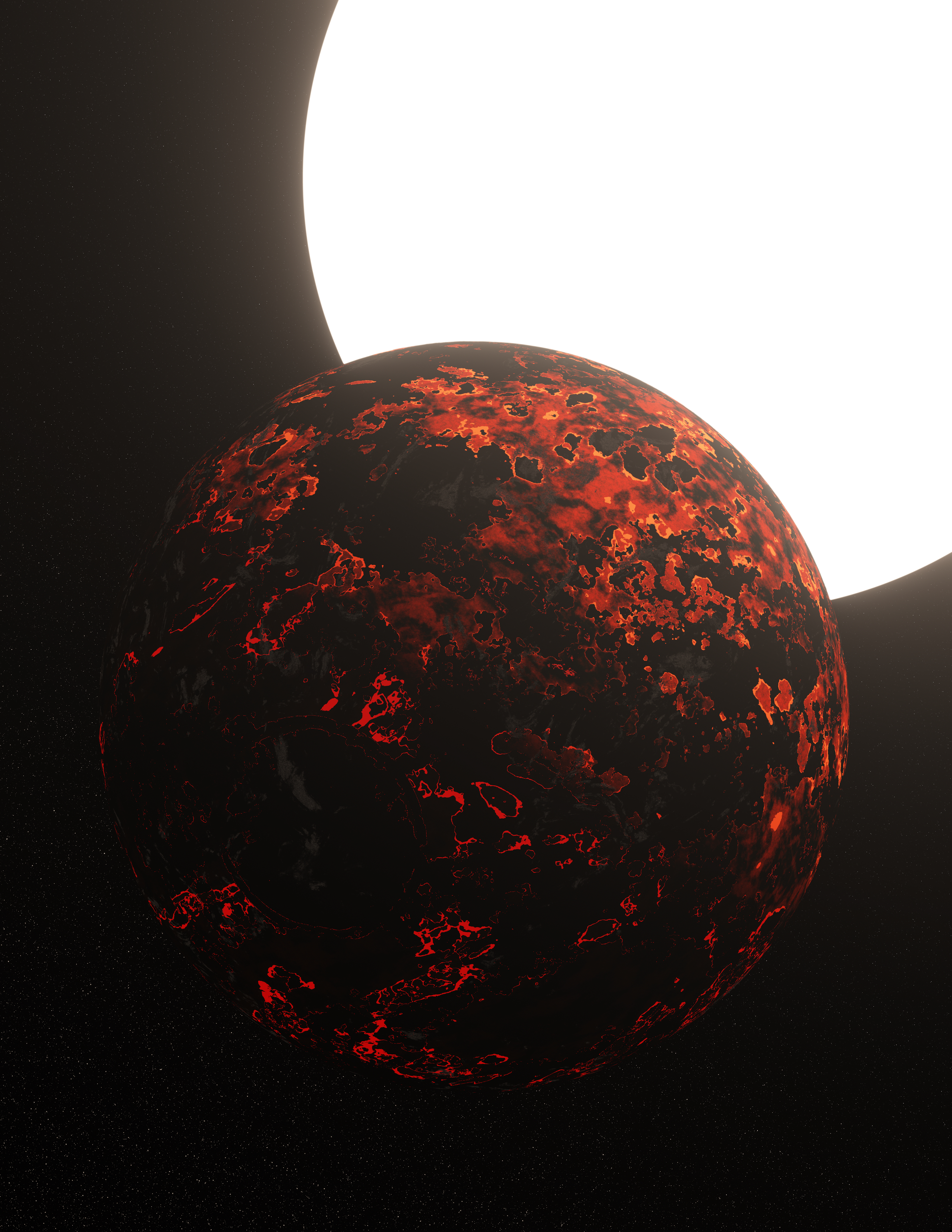
An artistic rendering of Kepler 78b.

=== Environment ===
Kepler-78b orbits around its parent star once every 8.5 hours. It reflects 20% to 60% of the starlight it receives. Due to its extremely close solar orbit, which is about 40 times closer than Mercury is to the Sun, the planet's surface is estimated to be at a temperature of 2,200 K (1,930 °C; 3,500 °F). This temperature is high enough to have stripped the planet of any stable atmosphere, but the liquid and solid portions of the planet should be stable. According to Francesco Pepe, the planet may be Earth-sized, but "it can be imagined like a lava planet rather than an Earth-like planet".

== Origin ==
According to Harvard–Smithsonian Center for Astrophysics astronomer Dimitar Sasselov, "this lava world is an abomination. There's no physical way a small world, only 12 percent larger than Earth, could have evolved in that location and there's no known mechanism that could have transported it there. But one thing that is certain, it can't stay roasting in that hellish orbit for long; it's destined to get swallowed by its star very soon". It is estimated that the planet will be swallowed by its parent star in about three billion years.
