= WASP-47 =

Star in the constellation Aquarius

Observation data Epoch J2000 Equinox ICRS
- Constellation: Aquarius
- Right ascension: 22^{h} 04^{m} 48.7262^{s}
- Declination: −12° 01′ 07.999″
- Apparent magnitude (V): 11.9

Characteristics
- Evolutionary stage: subgiant
- Spectral type: G9V

Astrometry
Radial velocity (R_{v})	−26.56(47) km/s
Proper motion (μ)	RA: 15.074(20) mas/yr Dec.: −41.467(20) mas/yr
Parallax (π)	3.7010±0.0201 mas
Distance	881 ± 5 ly (270 ± 1 pc)

Details
Mass	1.11±0.05 M_{☉}
Radius	1.16±0.26 R_{☉}
Luminosity	1.11 L_{☉}
Surface gravity (log g)	4.34 cgs
Temperature	5,576±67 K
Metallicity [Fe/H]	+0.36±0.05 dex
Rotation	32.5±3.9 d
Age	6.3+1.8 −1.6 Gyr

Other designations
- K2-23, EPIC 206103150, TOI-4539, TIC 102264230, WASP-47, 2MASS J22044873-1201079, WISE J220448.73-120108.3

Database references
SIMBAD	data
Exoplanet Archive	data

WASP-47 is a star similar in size and brightness to the Sun about 881 light-years away in the constellation Aquarius. It lies within the Kepler K2 campaign field 3. It was first noticed to have a hot Jupiter exoplanet orbiting every 4 days in 2012 by the Wide Angle Search for Planets (WASP) team. While it was thought to be a typical hot Jupiter system, three more planets were found in 2015: an outer gas giant within the habitable zone, a hot Neptune exterior to the hot Jupiter's orbit and a super-Earth interior to the hot Jupiter's orbit. WASP-47 is the only planetary system known to have both planets near the hot Jupiter and another planet much further out.

== Nomenclature and history ==
Prior to the discovery of its planets, WASP-47 was given the 2MASS designation of 2MASS J22044873-1201079. It was also observed by the Wide-field Infrared Survey Explorer and given the designation WISE J220448.74-120108.4. When observed by NASA's K2 mission, it was given the Ecliptic Plane Input Catalog designation of EPIC 206103150, and later named K2-23 after the discovery of planets d and e.

In 2012, a team from the SuperWASP group, led by Coel Hellier, announced the discovery of a Hot Jupiter exoplanet, with the designation WASP-47b, orbiting every 4.17 days. Three years later in 2015, Neveu-Van Malle et al. found a second planet, WASP-47c, orbiting within the habitable zone of the system using the HARPS spectrograph at the La Silla Observatory in Chile. Using data from NASA's K2 mission a Planet Hunters volunteer discovered multiple planets around WASP-47 and after analysing the data the researchers (Becker et al. 2015) published the two additional transiting planets, the Hot Neptune WASP-47d and the Mega-Earth WASP-47e, orbiting near WASP-47b.

== Stellar characteristics ==
WASP-47 is a G-type main-sequence star of spectral type G9V, making it quite similar to the Sun. It is 1.11 M_{☉} and 1.16 R_{☉}, with a temperature of 5,576 K and an age of about 6.5 billion years. In comparison, the Sun has a slightly higher temperature of 5,772 K but is significantly younger, at 4.5 billion years old.

The star is very metal-rich, with a metallicity ([Fe/H]) of about +0.36, or about twice the amount of iron and other elements heavier than Hydrogen and Helium than the Sun. This would explain how two massive gas giants, as well as a Mega-Earth, were able to form around the same star. WASP-47 is estimated to have a luminosity of 1.16 L_{☉}.

The star's apparent magnitude, or how bright it appears from Earth's perspective, is around 12. Therefore, it is far too faint to be seen with the unaided eye.

== Planetary system ==
The WASP-47 planetary system
Companion (in order from star)	Mass	Semimajor axis (AU)	Orbital period (days)	Eccentricity	Inclination (°)	Radius
e	9.0±0.5 M_{🜨}	0.017	0.789592 ± 0.000011	0.03 ^{+0.036}_{−0.02}	85.98 ± 0.75	1.810 ± 0.027 R_{🜨}
b	363.6 ± 7.3 M_{🜨}	0.052	4.1591289 ± 0.0000042	0.0028 ^{+0.0042}_{−0.0020}	88.98 ± 0.20	12.64 ± 0.15 R_{🜨}
d	15.5±0.8 M_{🜨}	0.087	9.03077 ± 0.00017	0.00600 ^{+0.0098}_{−0.0041}	89.32 ± 0.23	3.576 ± 0.046 R_{🜨}
c	398.9 ± 9.1 M_{🜨}	1.42	588.5 ± 2.4	0.296 ± 0.017	—	—

WASP-47 has a diverse and complex system of four planets. Three of them – e, b, and d – transit the host star, while WASP-47c was found with the radial velocity method. The first three have widely varying sizes, between 1.8 and 13 times the radius of Earth. They are also much more massive than Earth, with the least massive WASP-47e at 9.0 M_{🜨}. Both gas giants are significantly more massive than Jupiter, at 1.2 and 1.57 M_{J}, respectively. In comparison, Jupiter is about 318 M_{🜨}. However, because of observation effects from Earth's turbulent atmosphere, the mass values for all four planets have relatively high uncertainties, with WASP-47c having the greatest uncertainty. Despite that, the compositions for the planets are well-constrained. WASP-47e has almost no volatile materials (including water vapour, hydrogen and helium), d has a thin gaseous envelope, and b and c are both gas giants like Jupiter and Saturn.

The presence of two rather small planets, as well as the orbital configuration of the first three planets, is not expected for hot Jupiter-systems, as a migrating gas giant is thought to kick out any small inner planets. In order for the system to come out the way it is now, the two gas giants likely would have to have formed before the lower-mass planets e and d. This is called two-stage planetary formation, and is hypothesized to have happened in the Solar System as well. It is hypothesized that WASP-47b would have moved inwards and brought planet-forming material close to the star. Once most of the gas dissipates, the two gas-poor planets form nearby the large hot Jupiter.

Based on the analysis of phase curves, it was found that the planet b might have a very dark surface (its albedo is tentatively measured at 0.016) and the planet e probably also has a low albedo as well. While the planet c lies within the habitable zone, it is unlikely that it is itself habitable although its large exomoons (if exist) might be.

Planets e, b, and d have very similar orbits, with orbital periods of 0.8, 4.2, and 9.1 days, respectively. All of them are very hot (with temperatures above 1000 K) and have very low orbital eccentricities, even lower than those of Earth. In stark contrast to the inner planets, c has an eccentric orbit (e = 0.36) lasting over 580 days within the habitable zone of its host star. The high eccentricity cannot be explained by the inward migration of WASP-47b, and there is not any secondary star to cause it. The only likely remaining explanation is that another massive planet altered the orbit of WASP-47c that is either further out in the system or was ejected billions of years ago.

== See also ==
- Planetary migration
- Nice model
- 55 Cancri e, another large rocky planet very similar to WASP-47e.
