= Exometeorology =

Study of exoplanet atmospheres

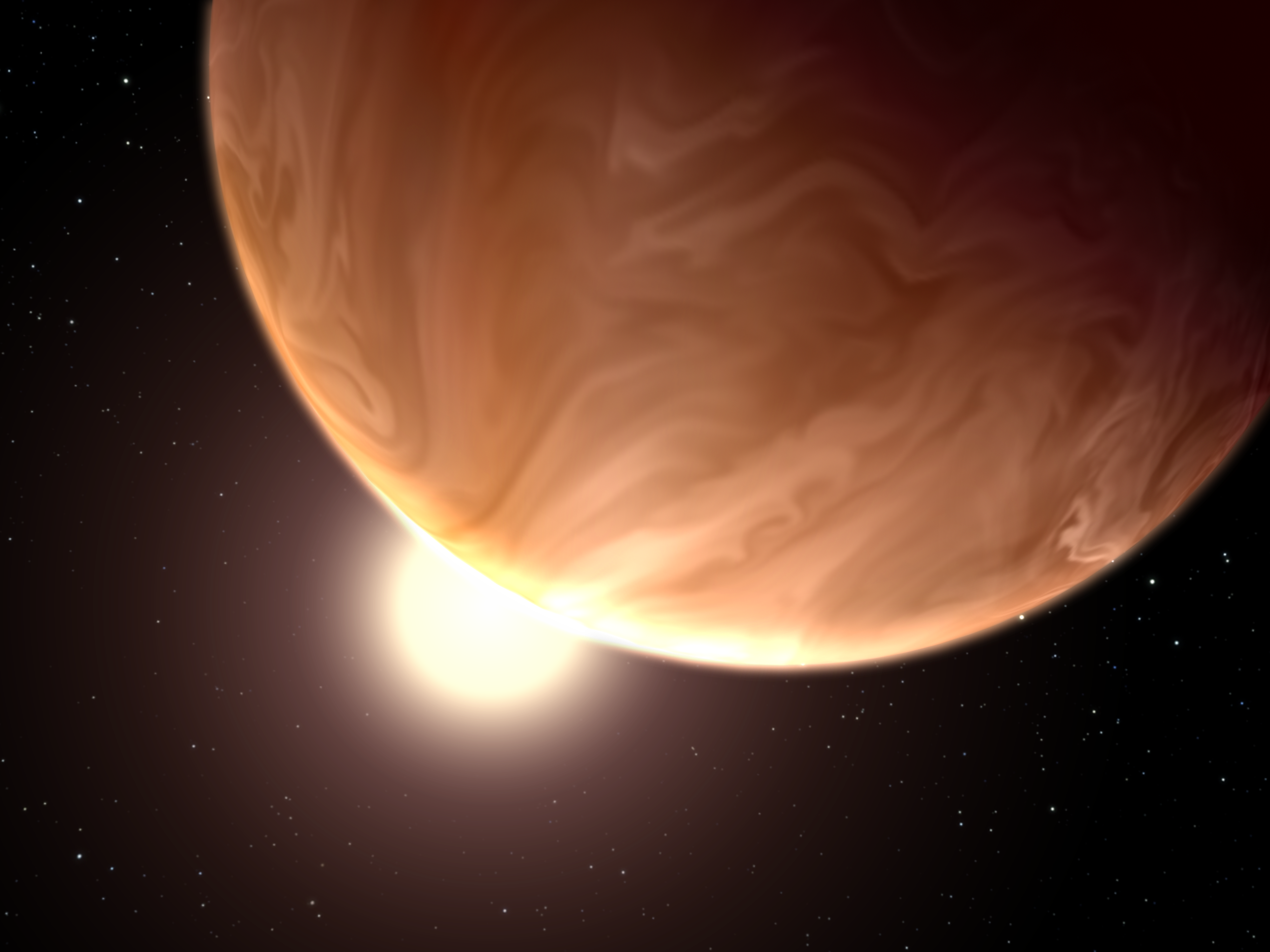
Artist's concept of Enaiposha showing clouds covering the planet's surface. Because there are such a wide variety of exoplanets, air and cloud compositions and circulation patterns can vary greatly from exoplanet to exoplanet.

Exometeorology is the study of atmospheric conditions of exoplanets and other non-stellar celestial bodies outside the Solar System, such as brown dwarfs. The diversity of possible sizes, compositions, and temperatures for exoplanets (and brown dwarfs) leads to a similar diversity of theorized atmospheric conditions. However, exoplanet detection technology has only recently developed enough to allow direct observation of exoplanet atmospheres, so there is currently very little observational data about meteorological variations in those atmospheres.

== Observational and theoretical foundations ==
=== Modeling and theoretical foundations ===
Climate models have been used to study Earth's climate since the 1960s and other planets in the Solar System since the 1990s. Once exoplanets were discovered, those same models were used to investigate the climates of planets such as Proxima Centauri b and the now-refuted Gliese 581g. These studies simulated what atmospheric pressures and compositions are necessary to maintain liquid water on each terrestrial exoplanet's surface, given their orbital distances and rotation periods. Climate models have also been used to study the possible atmospheres of the Hot Jupiter HD 209458b, the Hot Neptune GJ 1214b, and Kepler-1649b, a theorized Venus analog.

These models assume that the exoplanet in question has an atmosphere in order to determine its climate. Without an atmosphere, the only temperature variations on the planet's surface would be due to insolation from its star. Additionally, the main causes of weather - air pressure and air temperature differences which drive winds and the motion of air masses - can only exist in an environment with a significant atmosphere, as opposed to a tenuous and, consequently, rather static atmosphere, like that of Mercury. Thus, the existence of exometeorological weather (as opposed to space weather) on an exoplanet depends on whether it has an atmosphere at all.

=== Recent discoveries and observational foundations ===
The first exoplanet atmosphere ever observed was that of HD 209458b, a Hot Jupiter orbiting a G-type star similar in size and mass to the Sun. Its atmosphere was discovered by spectroscopy; as the planet transited its star, its atmosphere absorbed some of the star's light according to the detectable absorption spectrum of sodium in the planet's atmosphere. While the presence of sodium was later refuted, that discovery paved the way for many other exoplanet atmospheres to be observed and measured. Recently, terrestrial exoplanets have had their atmospheres observed; in 2017, astronomers using a telescope at the European Southern Observatory (ESO) in Chile found an atmosphere on an earth-sized exoplanet Gliese 1132 b.

However, measuring traditional meteorological variations in an exoplanet's atmosphere — such as precipitation or cloud coverage — is more difficult than observing just the atmosphere, due to the limited resolutions of current telescopes. That said, some exoplanets have shown atmospheric variations when observed at different times and other evidence of active weather. For example, an international team of astronomers in 2012 observed variations in hydrogen escape speeds from the atmosphere of HD 189733 b using the Hubble Space Telescope. Additionally, HD 189733 b and Tau Boötis Ab have their hottest surface temperatures displaced eastward from their subsolar points, which is only possible if those tidally-locked planets have strong winds displacing the heated air eastward, i.e. a westerly wind. Lastly, computer simulations of HD 80606b predict that the sudden increase in insolation it receives at periastron spawns shockwave-like windstorms that reverberate around the planet and distribute the sudden heat influx.

== Theorized weather ==
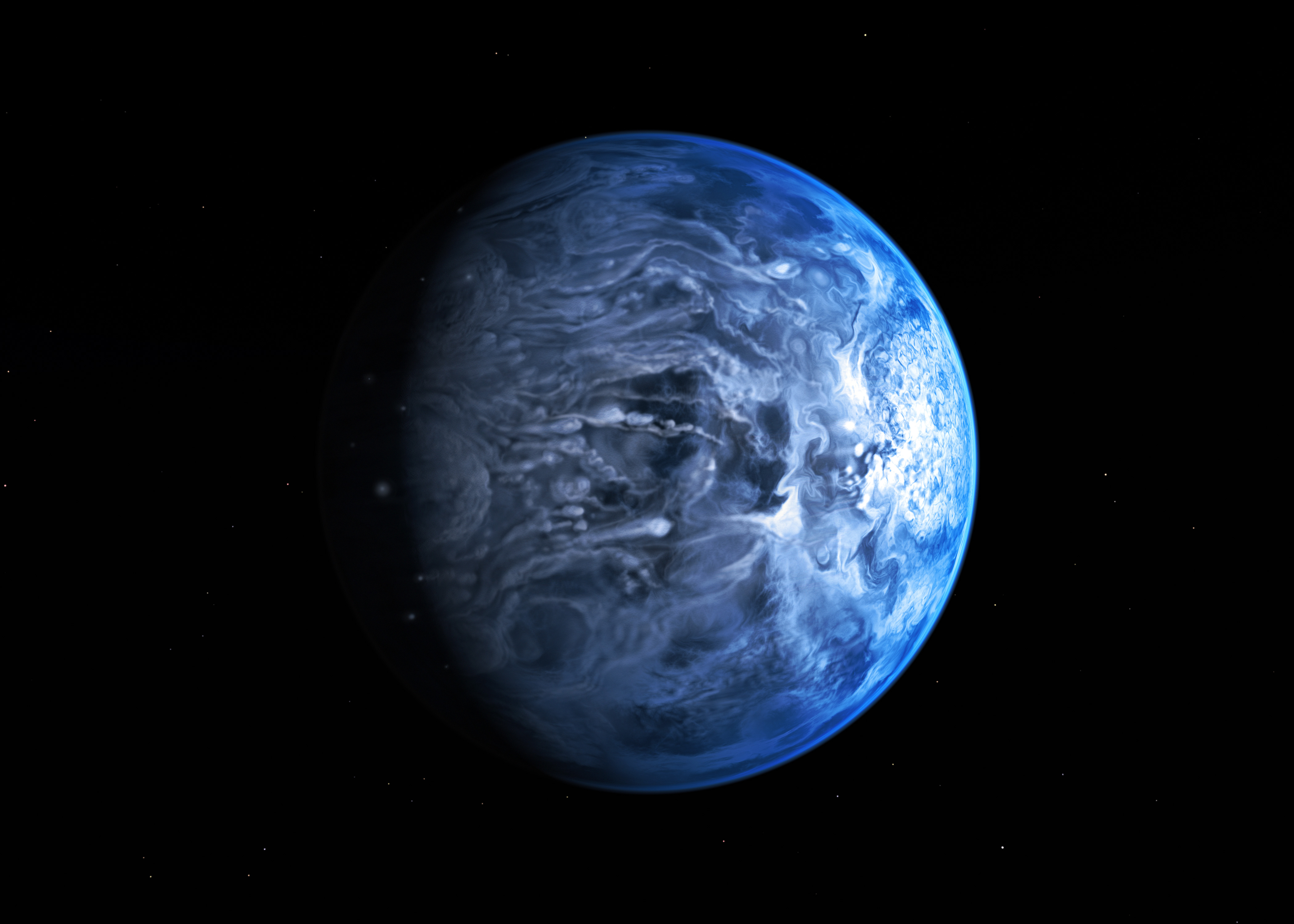
Artist's impression of HD 189733b. This exoplanet has numerous observed and theorized weather conditions, including variations in the escape speed of atmospheric hydrogen, 2 km/s winds in an easterly jet around its equator, and rains of molten glass.

Empirical observations of weather on exoplanets are still rudimentary, due to the limited resolutions of current telescopes. What little atmospheric variations can be observed usually relate to wind, such as variations in the escape speeds of atmospheric hydrogen in HD 189733b or just the speeds of globally circulating winds on that same planet. However, a number of other observable, non-meteorological properties of exoplanets factor into what exoweather is theorized to occur on their surfaces; some of these properties are listed below.

=== Presence of an atmosphere ===
As mentioned previously, exometeorology requires that an exoplanet has an atmosphere. Some exoplanets that do not currently have atmospheres began with one; however, these likely lost their primordial atmospheres due to atmospheric escape from stellar insolation and stellar flares or lost them due to giant impacts stripping the exoplanet's atmosphere.

Some exoplanets, specifically lava planets, might have partial atmospheres with unique meteorological patterns. Tidally-locked lava worlds receive so much stellar insolation that some molten crust vaporizes and forms an atmosphere on the day side of the planet. Strong winds attempt to carry this new atmosphere to the night side of the planet; however, the vaporized atmosphere cools as it nears the planet's night side and precipitates back down to the surface, essentially collapsing once it reaches the terminator. This effect has been modeled based on data from transits of K2-141b as well as CoRoT-7b, Kepler-10b, and 55 Cancri e. This unusual pattern of crustal evaporation, kilometer-per-second winds, and atmospheric collapse through precipitation might be provable with observations by advanced telescopes like Webb.

Exoplanets with full atmospheres are able to have diverse ranges of weather conditions, similar to weather on the terrestrial planets and gas giants of our Solar System. Planet-wide atmospheres allow for global air circulation, stellar thermal energy distribution, and relatively fast chemical cycling, as seen in the crustal material transportation by lava worlds' partial atmospheres and Earth's own water and carbon cycles. This ability to cycle and globally distribute matter and energy can drive iron rain on hot Jupiters, 2 km/s (4,500 mph) super-rotating winds on HD 189733b, and atmospheric precipitation and collapse on tidally-locked worlds.

=== Orbital properties ===
One of the most important factors determining an exoplanet's properties is its orbital period, or its average distance from its star. This alone determines a planet's effective temperature (the baseline temperature without added insulation from an atmosphere) and how likely the planet is to be tidally locked. These, in turn, can affect what chemical compositions of clouds can be present in a planet's atmosphere, the general motion of heat transfer and atmospheric circulation, and the locations where weather can occur (as with tidally-locked lava worlds with partial atmospheres).

For example, a gas giant's orbital period can determine whether its wind patterns are primarily advective (heat and air flowing from the top of the star-heated atmosphere to the bottom) or convective (heat and air flowing from down near the gradually contracting planet's core up through the atmosphere). If a gas giant's atmosphere receives more heat from insolation than the planet's unending gravitational contraction, then it will have advective circulation patterns; if the opposite heat source is stronger, it will have convective circulation patterns, as Jupiter exhibits.

Additionally, an exoplanet's average incident stellar radiation, determined by its orbital period, can determine what types of chemical cycling an exoplanet might have. Earth's water cycle occurs because our planet's average temperature is close enough to water's triple point (at normal atmospheric pressures) that the planet's surface can sustain three phases of the chemical; similar cycling is theorized for Titan, as its surface temperature and pressure is close to methane's triple point.

Similarly, an exoplanet's orbital eccentricity – how elliptical the planet's orbit is – can affect the incident stellar radiation it receives at different points in its orbit, and thus, can affect its meteorology. An extreme example of this is HD 80606b's shockwave-like storms that occur whenever the planet reaches the innermost point in its extremely eccentric orbit. The difference in distance between its apastron (analogous to Earth's aphelion) and its periastron (perihelion) is so large that the planet's effective temperature varies greatly throughout its orbit. A less extreme example is eccentricity in a terrestrial exoplanet's orbit. If the rocky planet orbits a dim red dwarf star, slight eccentricities can lead to effective temperature variations large enough to collapse the planet's atmosphere, given the right atmospheric compositions, temperatures, and pressures.

== See also ==
- Atmosphere and extraterrestrial atmosphere
- Atmospheric circulation of exoplanets; the mathematical models governing exoplanetary air circulation
- Atmospheric physics
