= Atmospheric circulation of exoplanets =

Astrophysical model

The atmospheric circulation on exoplanets refers to the large-scale movement of air masses on planets orbiting stars other than the Sun (exoplanets). This is a nascent field of study due to the challenges in directly observing their atmospheres.

While data is still limited, scientists apply fundamental principles of fluid dynamics to model and understand the potential range of atmospheric motions on these distant worlds. The theoretical framework first considers the Navier–Stokes equations, the governing equations of fluid motion, then applies simplifying assumptions to create models specific to large-scale atmospheric dynamics. These models are used to explore how various planetary characteristics, such as rotation rate (fast vs. slow) and atmospheric stratification (stable vs. unstable), influence circulation patterns. For example, a planet's rotation rate can determine whether its atmosphere operates under geostrophic balance or cyclostrophic balance. This theoretical framework, often validated against observations of planets within the Solar System, offers insights into the diverse climates that may exist beyond the Solar System.

== Atmospheric motions ==
=== Coriolis force ===
Coriolis force appears when considering motion of an object through a non-inertial frame of reference.

When considering atmospheric circulation we tend to take the planetary body as the frame of reference. In fact, this is a non-inertial frame of reference which has acceleration due to the planet's rotation about its axis. Coriolis force is the force that acts on objects moving within the planetary frame of reference, as a result of the planet's rotation. Mathematically, the acceleration due to Coriolis force can be written as:

$\boldsymbol{a} = 2\boldsymbol{\Omega}\times \boldsymbol{u}$

where

- $\boldsymbol{u}$ is the flow velocity
- $\boldsymbol{\Omega}$ is the planet's angular velocity vector

This force acts perpendicular to the flow and velocity and the planet's angular velocity vector, and comes into play when considering the atmospheric motion of a rotating planet.

=== Mathematical models ===
==== Navier-Stokes momentum equation ====
Conservation of momentum for a flow is given by the following equation:

$\frac{d \boldsymbol{u}}{d t} = -\frac{1}{\rho}\nabla p - (2\boldsymbol{\Omega}\times \boldsymbol{u}) - [\boldsymbol{\Omega}\times(\boldsymbol{\Omega}\times\boldsymbol{r})]-g\boldsymbol{k}+\boldsymbol{F}_{visc}$

where

- $\frac{d}{dt} = \frac{\partial}{\partial t} + \boldsymbol{u}\cdot\nabla$ is the material derivative
- $p$ is the pressure
- $\rho$ is the density
- $g$ is the gravitational acceleration
- $\boldsymbol{r}$ is the vector from the rotation axis
- $\boldsymbol{F}_{visc}$ is the force of friction

The term $\boldsymbol{\Omega}\times(\boldsymbol{\Omega}\times\boldsymbol{r})$ is the centripetal acceleration due to the rotation of the planet.

==== Simplified model for large-scale motion ====
The above equation can be simplified to a form suitable for large-scale atmospheric motion. First, the velocity vector $\boldsymbol{u}$ is split into the three components of wind:

$\boldsymbol{u} = u\boldsymbol{i} + v\boldsymbol{j} + w\boldsymbol{k}$

where

- $u$ is the zonal wind
- $v$ is the meridional wind
- $w$ is the vertical wind

Next, we ignore friction and vertical wind. Thus, the equations for zonal and meridional wind simplify to:

$\frac{du}{dt} - \left(f + \frac{u\tan\phi}{a}\right)v = -\frac{1}{\rho}\frac{\partial p}{\partial x}$

$\frac{dv}{dt} + \left(f + \frac{u\tan\phi}{a}\right)u = -\frac{1}{\rho}\frac{\partial p}{\partial y}$

and the equation in the vertical direction simplifies to the hydrostatic equilibrium equation:

$\frac{\partial p}{\partial z} = -g\rho$

where the parameter $g$ has absorbed the vertical component of the centripetal force. In the above equations:

$f = 2\Omega\sin\phi$

is the Coriolis parameter, $\phi$ is the latitude and $a$ is the radius of the planet.

== Key drivers of circulation ==
=== Thermodynamics ===
Temperature gradients are one of the drivers of circulation, as one effect of atmospheric flow is to transport heat from places of high temperature to those of low temperature in an effort to reach thermal equilibrium. Generally, planets have stably stratified atmospheres. This means that motion due to temperature gradient in the vertical direction is opposed by the pressure gradient in the vertical direction. In this case, it is the horizontal temperature gradients (on constant pressure surfaces) which drive circulation. Such temperature gradients are typically maintained by uneven heating/cooling throughout a planet's atmosphere. On Earth, for example, at the equator, the atmosphere absorbs more net energy from the Sun that it does at the poles.

=== Planetary rotation ===
As noted previously, planetary rotation is important when it comes to atmospheric circulation as Coriolis and centripetal forces arise as a results of planetary rotation. When considering a steady version of the simplified equations for large-scale motion presented above, both Coriolis and centripetal forces work to balance out the horizontal pressure gradients. Depending on the rotation rate of the planet, one of these forces will dominate and affect the atmospheric circulation accordingly.

==== Geostrophic balance ====
For a planet with rapid rotation, the Coriolis force is the dominant force which balances pressure gradient. In this case the equations for large-scale motion further simplify to:

$u_g = -\frac{1}{f\rho}\left(\frac{\partial p}{\partial y}\right)_{z}$

$v_g = \frac{1}{f\rho}\left(\frac{\partial p}{\partial x}\right)_{z}$

where the $z$ subscript denotes a constant altitude surface and the $g$ subscript denotes geostrophic wind. Note that in this case, the geostrophic wind is perpendicular to pressure gradient. This is due to the fact that Coriolis force acts perpendicularly to the direction of wind. Therefore, since pressure gradient induces a wind parallel to the gradient, the Coriolis force will act perpendicularly to the pressure gradient. As Coriolis force dominates in this regime, the resulting winds are perpendicular to pressure gradient.

==== Cyclostrophic balance ====
For a planet with a low rotation rate and negligible Coriolis force, pressure gradient may instead be balanced by centripetal acceleration. In this case the equations for large-scale motion further simplify to:

$\frac{u^2\tan\phi}{a} = -\frac{1}{\rho}\frac{\partial p}{\partial y}$

for a prevailing wind in the east–west direction.

== See also ==
- Exometeorology
- Extraterrestrial atmospheres
