= Extraterrestrial atmosphere =

Area of astronomical research

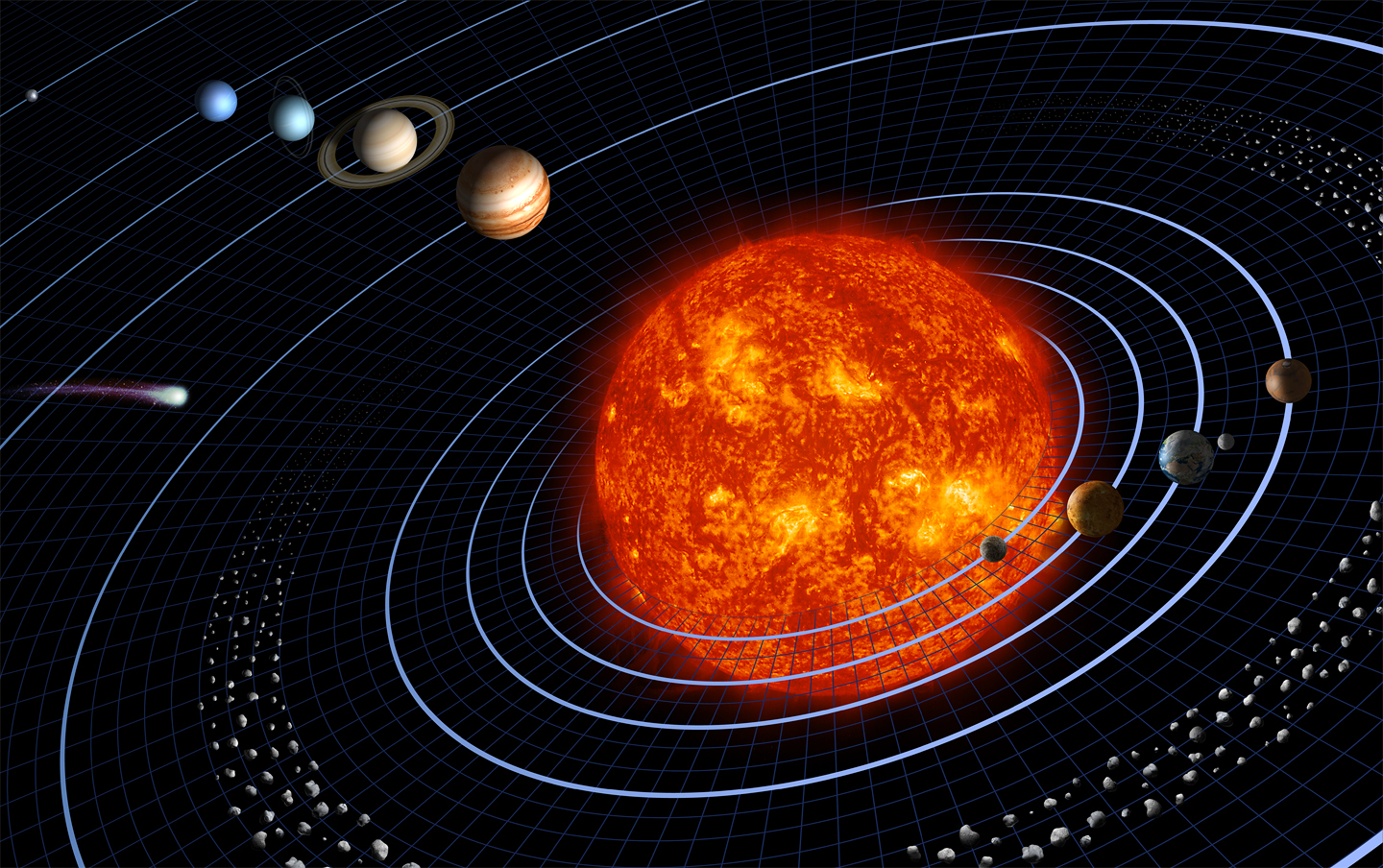
Major features of the Solar System (not to scale)

Graphs of escape velocity against surface temperature of some Solar System objects showing which gases are retained. The objects are drawn to scale, and their data points are at the black dots in the middle.

The study of extraterrestrial atmospheres is an active field of research, both as an aspect of astronomy and to gain insight into Earth's atmosphere. In addition to Earth, many of the other astronomical objects in the Solar System have atmospheres. These include all the giant planets, as well as the other planets Mars, Venus and Titan, Triton, and Pluto.

Several moons and other bodies also have atmospheres, as do comets and the Sun. There is evidence that extrasolar planets can have an atmosphere. Comparisons of these atmospheres to one another and to Earth's atmosphere broaden our basic understanding of atmospheric processes such as the greenhouse effect, aerosol and cloud physics, and atmospheric chemistry and dynamics.

In September 2022, astronomers were reported to have formed a new group, called "Categorizing Atmospheric Technosignatures" (CATS), to list the results of exoplanet atmosphere studies for biosignatures, technosignatures and related.

== Planets ==
=== Inner planets ===
==== Mercury ====
Due to its small size (and thus its small gravity), Mercury has no substantial atmosphere. Its extremely thin atmosphere mostly consists of a small amount of helium and traces of sodium, potassium, and oxygen. These gases derive from the solar wind, radioactive decay, meteor impacts, and breakdown of Mercury's crust. Mercury's atmosphere is not stable and is constantly being refreshed because of its atoms escaping into space as a result of the planet's heat.

==== Venus ====
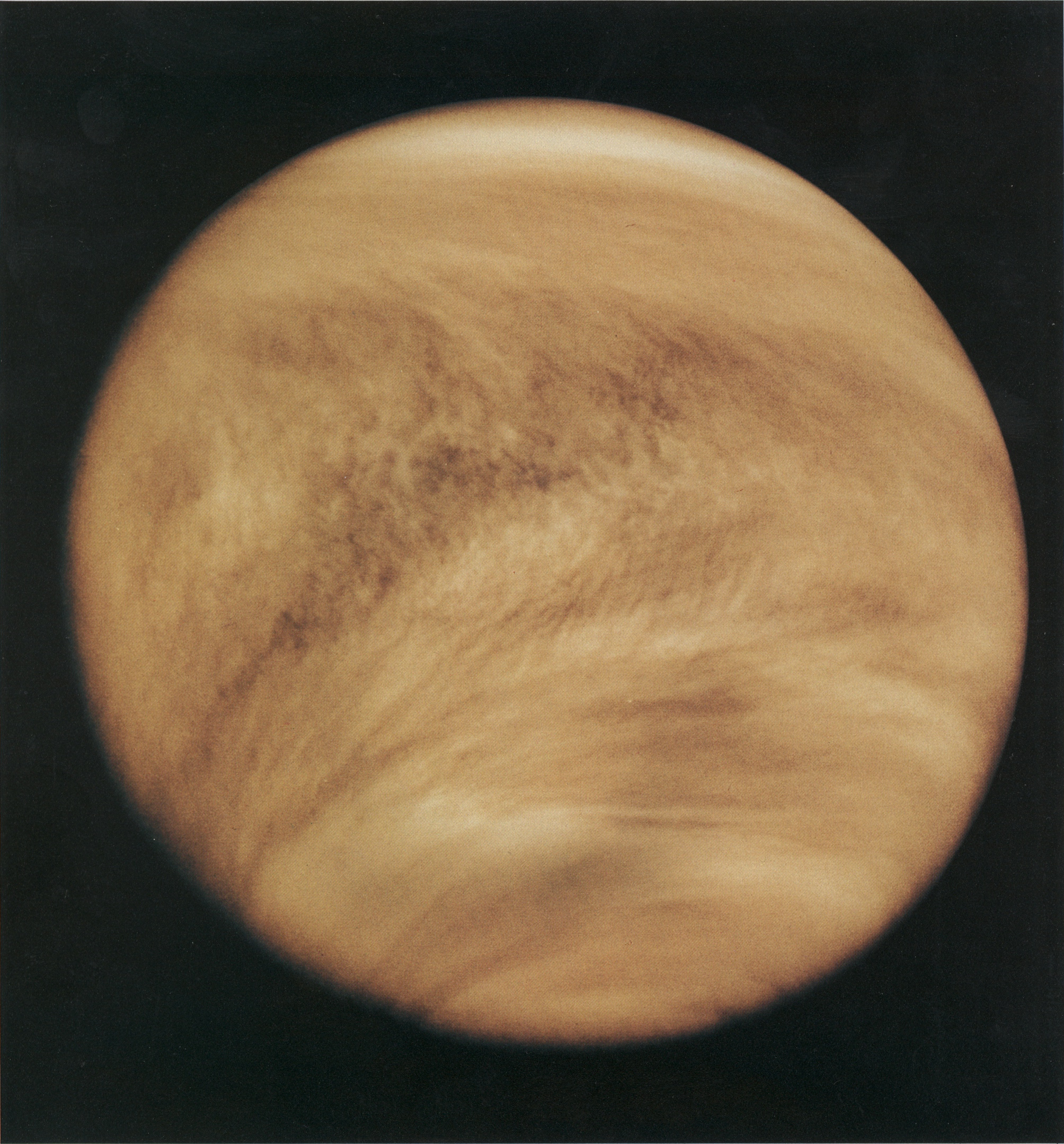
Venus' atmosphere in UV, by Pioneer Venus Orbiter in 1979

Venus' atmosphere is mostly composed of carbon dioxide. It contains minor amounts of nitrogen and other trace elements, including compounds based on hydrogen, nitrogen, sulphur, carbon, and oxygen. The atmosphere of Venus is much hotter and denser than that of Earth, though shallower. As greenhouse gases warm a lower atmosphere, they cool the upper atmosphere, leading to compact thermospheres. By some definitions, Venus has no stratosphere.

The troposphere begins at the surface and extends up to an altitude of 65 kilometres (an altitude at which the mesosphere has already been reached on Earth). At the top of the troposphere, temperature and pressure reach Earth-like levels. Winds at the surface are a few metres per second, reaching 70 m/s or more in the upper troposphere. The stratosphere and mesosphere extend from 65 km to 95 km in height. The thermosphere and exosphere begin at around 95 kilometres, eventually reaching the limit of the atmosphere at about 220 to 250 km.

The air pressure at Venus' surface is about 92 times that of the Earth. The enormous amount of CO_{2} in the atmosphere creates a strong greenhouse effect, raising the surface temperature to around 470 °C, hotter than that of any other planet in the Solar System.

==== Mars ====
The Martian atmosphere is very thin and composed mainly of carbon dioxide, with some nitrogen and argon. The average surface pressure on Mars is 0.6-0.9 kPa, compared to about 101 kPa for Earth. This results in a much lower atmospheric thermal inertia, and as a consequence Mars is subject to strong thermal tides that can change total atmospheric pressure by up to 10%. The thin atmosphere also increases the variability of the planet's temperature. Martian surface temperatures vary from lows of approximately −140 °C (−220 °F) during the polar winters to highs of up to 20 °C (70 °F) in summers.

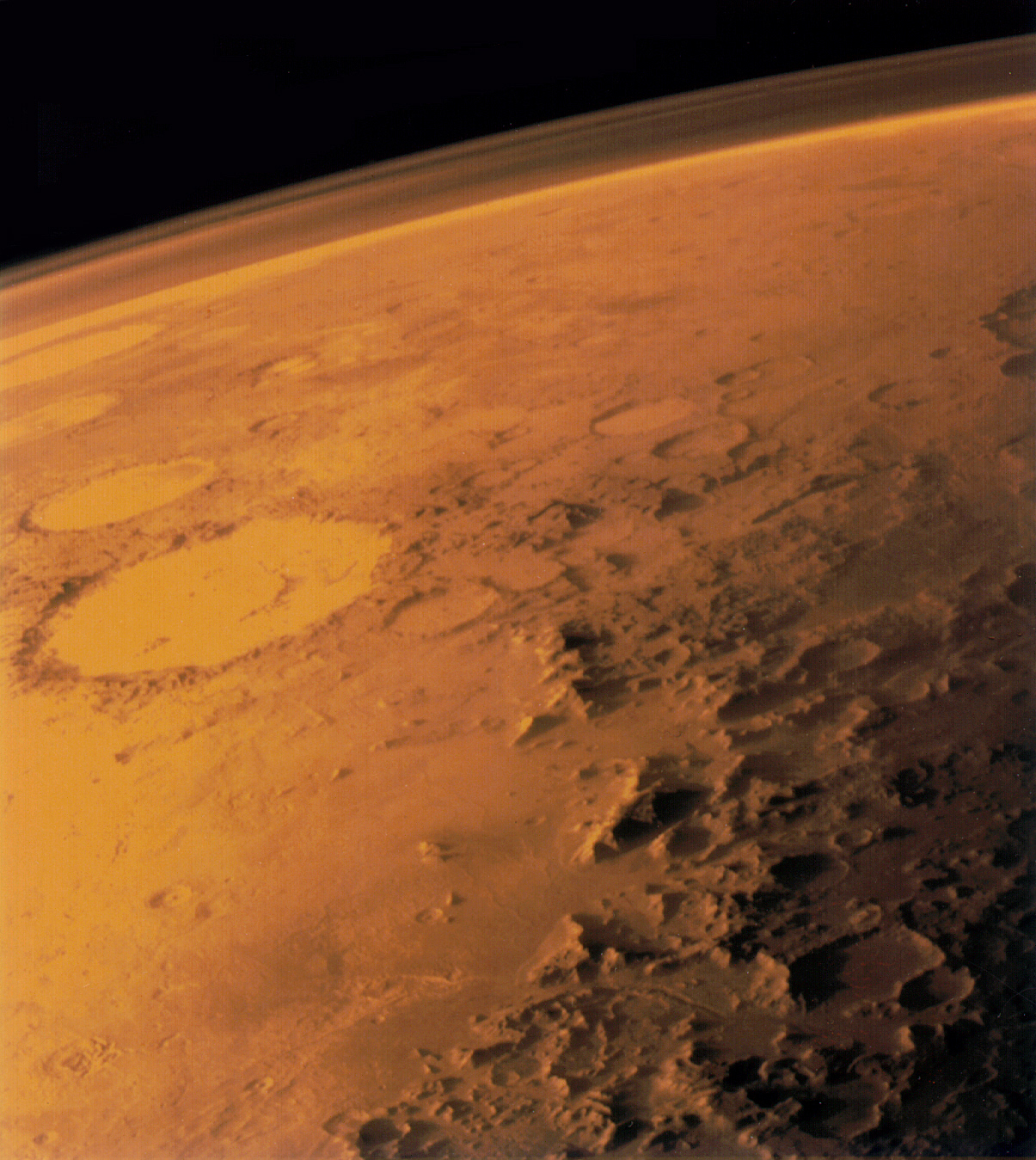
The tenuous atmosphere of Mars visible on the horizon.

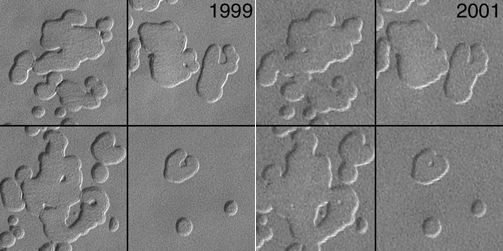
Pits in south polar ice cap, MGS 1999, NASA

Between the Viking and Mars Global Surveyor missions, Mars saw "Much colder (10-20 K) global atmospheric temperatures were observed during the 1997 versus 1977 perihelion periods" and "that the global aphelion atmosphere of Mars is colder, less dusty, and cloudier than indicated by the established Viking climatology," with "generally colder atmospheric temperatures and lower dust loading in recent decades on Mars than during the Viking Mission."

The Mars Reconnaissance Orbiter, though spanning a much shorter dataset, shows no warming of planetary average temperature, and a possible cooling. "MCS MY 28 temperatures are an average of 0.9 (daytime) and 1.7 K (night- time) cooler than TES MY 24 measurements." Locally and regionally, however, changes in pits in the layer of frozen carbon dioxide at the Martian south pole observed between 1999 and 2001 suggest the south polar ice cap is shrinking. More recent observations indicate that Mars' south pole is continuing to melt. "It's evaporating right now at a prodigious rate," says Michael Malin, principal investigator for the Mars Orbiter Camera.

The pits in the ice are growing by about 3 meters (9.8 ft) per year. Malin states that conditions on Mars are not currently conductive to the formation of new ice. A web site has suggested that this indicates a "climate change in progress" on Mars. Multiple studies suggests this may be a local phenomenon rather than a global one.

Colin Wilson has proposed that the observed variations are caused by irregularities in the orbit of Mars. William Feldman speculates the warming could be because Mars might be coming out of an ice age. Other scientists state the warming may be a result of albedo changes from dust storms. The study predicts the planet could continue to warm, as a result of positive feedback.

On June 7, 2018, NASA announced that the Curiosity rover detected a cyclical seasonal variation in atmospheric methane, as well as the presence of kerogen and other complex organic compounds.

=== Giant planets ===
The four outer planets of the Solar System are all giant planets: the gas giants Jupiter and Saturn, and the ice giants Uranus and Neptune. They share some atmospheric commonalities. All have atmospheres that are mostly hydrogen and helium and that blend into the liquid interior at pressures greater than the critical pressure, so that there is no clear boundary between atmosphere and body.

==== Jupiter ====
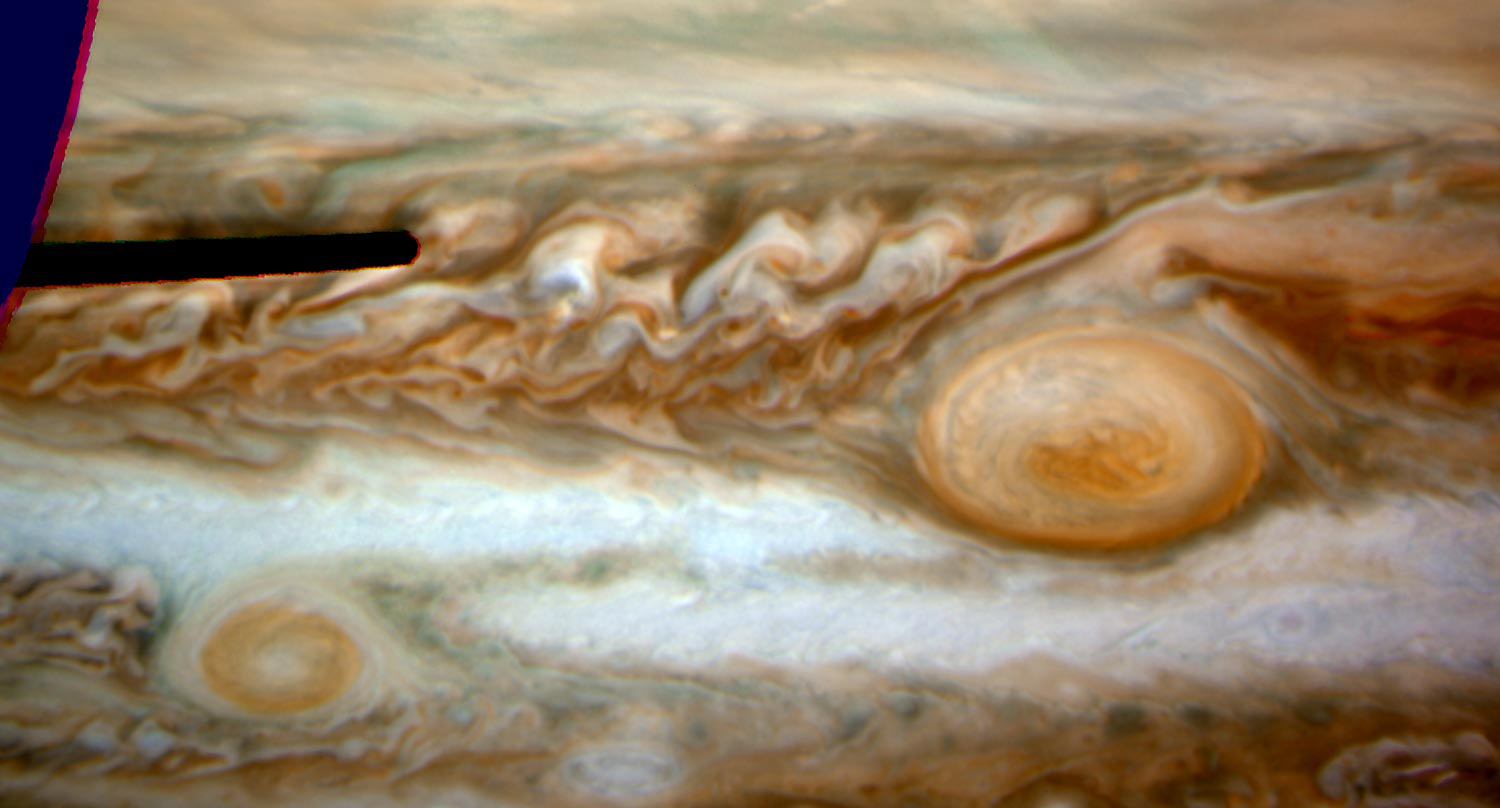
Oval BA on the left and the Great Red Spot on the right

Jupiter's upper atmosphere is composed of about 75% hydrogen and 24% helium by mass, with the remaining 1% consisting of other elements. The interior contains denser materials such that the distribution is roughly 71% hydrogen, 24% helium and 5% other elements by mass. The atmosphere contains trace amounts of methane, water vapor, ammonia, and silicon-based compounds. There are also traces of carbon, ethane, hydrogen sulfide, neon, oxygen, phosphine, and sulfur. The outermost layer of the atmosphere contains crystals of frozen ammonia, possibly underlaid by a thin layer of water.

Jupiter is covered with a cloud layer about 50 km deep. The clouds are composed of ammonia crystals and possibly ammonium hydrosulfide. The clouds are located in the tropopause and are arranged into bands of different latitudes, known as tropical regions. These are sub-divided into lighter-hued zones and darker belts. The interactions of these conflicting circulation patterns cause storms and turbulence.

The best-known feature of the cloud layer is the Great Red Spot, a persistent anticyclonic storm located 22° south of the equator that is larger than Earth. In 2000, an atmospheric feature formed in the southern hemisphere that is similar in appearance to the Great Red Spot, but smaller in size. The feature was named Oval BA, and has been nicknamed Red Spot Junior.

Observations of the Red Spot Jr. storm suggest Jupiter could be in a period of global climate change. This is hypothesized to be part of an approximately 70 year global climate cycle, characterized by the relatively rapid forming and subsequent slow erosion and merging of cyclonic and anticyclonic vortices in Jupiter's atmosphere. These vortices facilitate the heat exchange between poles and equator. If they have sufficiently eroded, heat exchange is strongly reduced and regional temperatures may shift by as much as 10 K, with the poles cooling down and the equator region heating up. The resulting large temperature differential destabilizes the atmosphere and thereby leads to the creation of new vortices.

==== Saturn ====
The outer atmosphere of Saturn consists of about 93.2% hydrogen and 6.7% helium. Trace amounts of ammonia, acetylene, ethane, phosphine, and methane have also been detected. As with Jupiter, the upper clouds on Saturn are composed of ammonia crystals, while the lower level clouds appear to be composed of either ammonium hydrosulfide (NH_{4}SH) or water.

The Saturnian atmosphere is in several ways similar to that of Jupiter. It exhibits a banded pattern similar to Jupiter's, and occasionally exhibits long-lived ovals caused by storms. A storm formation analogous to Jupiter's Great Red Spot, the Great White Spot, is a short-lived phenomenon that forms with a roughly 30-year periodicity. It was last observed in 1990. However, the storms and the band pattern are less visible and active than those of Jupiter, due to the overlying ammonia hazes in Saturn's troposphere.

Saturn's atmosphere has several unusual features. Its winds are among the Solar System's fastest, with Voyager data indicating peak easterly winds of 500 m/s. It is also the only planet with a warm polar vortex, and is the only planet other than Earth where eyewall clouds have been observed in hurricane-like structures.

==== Uranus ====
The atmosphere of Uranus is composed primarily of gas and various ices. It is about 83% hydrogen, 15% helium, 2% methane and traces of acetylene. Like Jupiter and Saturn, Uranus has a banded cloud layer, although this is not readily visible without enhancement of visual images of the planet. Unlike the larger giant planets, the low temperatures in the upper Uranian cloud layer, down to 50 K, causes cloud formation from methane rather than ammonia.

Less storm activity has been observed in the Uranian atmosphere than in those of Jupiter or Saturn, due to the overlying methane and acetylene hazes in its atmosphere making the planet look like a bland, light blue globe. Images taken in 1997 with the Hubble Space Telescope showed storm activity in that part of the atmosphere emerging from the 25-year-long Uranian winter. The general lack of storm activity may be related to the lack of an internal energy generation mechanism for Uranus, a feature unique among the giant planets.

==== Neptune ====
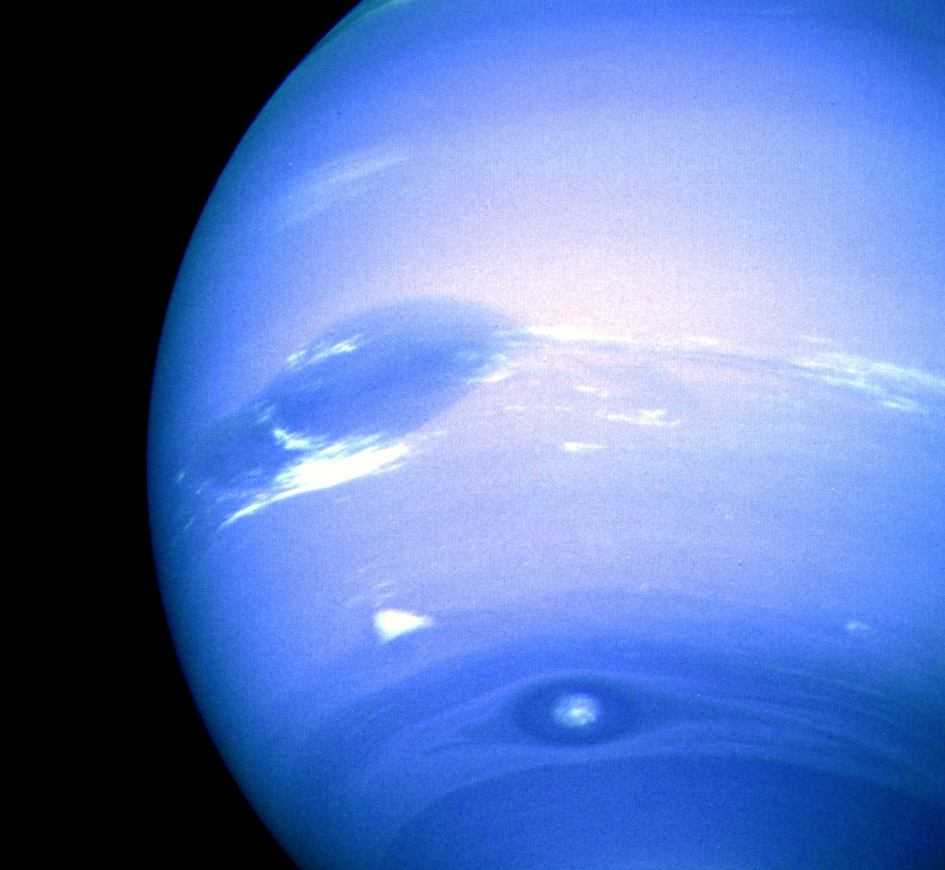
Neptune's Great Dark Spot (top), Scooter (middle white cloud), and Wizard's eye/Dark Spot 2 (bottom).

The atmosphere of Neptune is similar to that of Uranus. It is about 80% hydrogen, 19% helium, and 1.5% methane. However the weather activity on Neptune is much more active, and its atmosphere is slightly bluer than that of Uranus. The upper levels of the atmosphere reach temperatures of about 55 K, giving rise to methane clouds in its troposphere, which gives the planet its ultramarine color. Temperatures rise steadily deeper inside the atmosphere.

Neptune has extremely dynamic weather systems, including the highest wind speeds in the Solar System, thought to be powered by the flow of internal heat. Typical winds in the banded equatorial region can possess speeds of around 350 m/s (comparable to the speed of sound at room temperature on Earth viz. 343.6 m/s) while storm systems can have winds reaching up to around 900 m/s, in Neptune's atmosphere. Several large storm systems have been identified, including the Great Dark Spot, a cyclonic storm system the size of Eurasia, the Scooter, a white cloud group further south than the Great Dark Spot, and the Wizard's eye/Dark Spot 2, a southern cyclonic storm.

Neptune, the farthest planet from Earth, has increased in brightness since 1980. Neptune's brightness is statistically correlated with its stratospheric temperature. Hammel and Lockwood hypothesize that the change in brightness includes a solar variation component as well as a seasonal component, though they did not find a statistically significant correlation with solar variation. They propose that the resolution of this issue will be clarified by brightness observations in the next few years: forcing by a change in sub-solar latitude should be reflected in a flattening and decline of brightness, while solar forcing should be reflected in a flattening and then resumed rise of brightness.

== Other bodies in the Solar System ==
=== Natural satellites ===
Ten of the many natural satellites in the Solar System are known to have atmospheres: Europa, Io, Callisto, Enceladus, Ganymede, Titan, Rhea, Dione, Triton and Earth's Moon. Ganymede and Europa both have very tenuous oxygen atmospheres, thought to be produced by radiation splitting the water ice present on the surface of these moons into hydrogen and oxygen. Io has an extremely thin atmosphere consisting mainly of sulfur dioxide (SO_{2}), arising from volcanism and sunlight-driven sublimation of surface sulfur dioxide deposits.

The atmosphere of Enceladus is also extremely thin and variable, consisting mainly of water vapor, nitrogen, methane, and carbon dioxide vented from the moon's interior through cryovolcanism. The extremely thin carbon dioxide atmosphere of Callisto is thought to be replenished by sublimation from surface deposits.

==== Titan ====
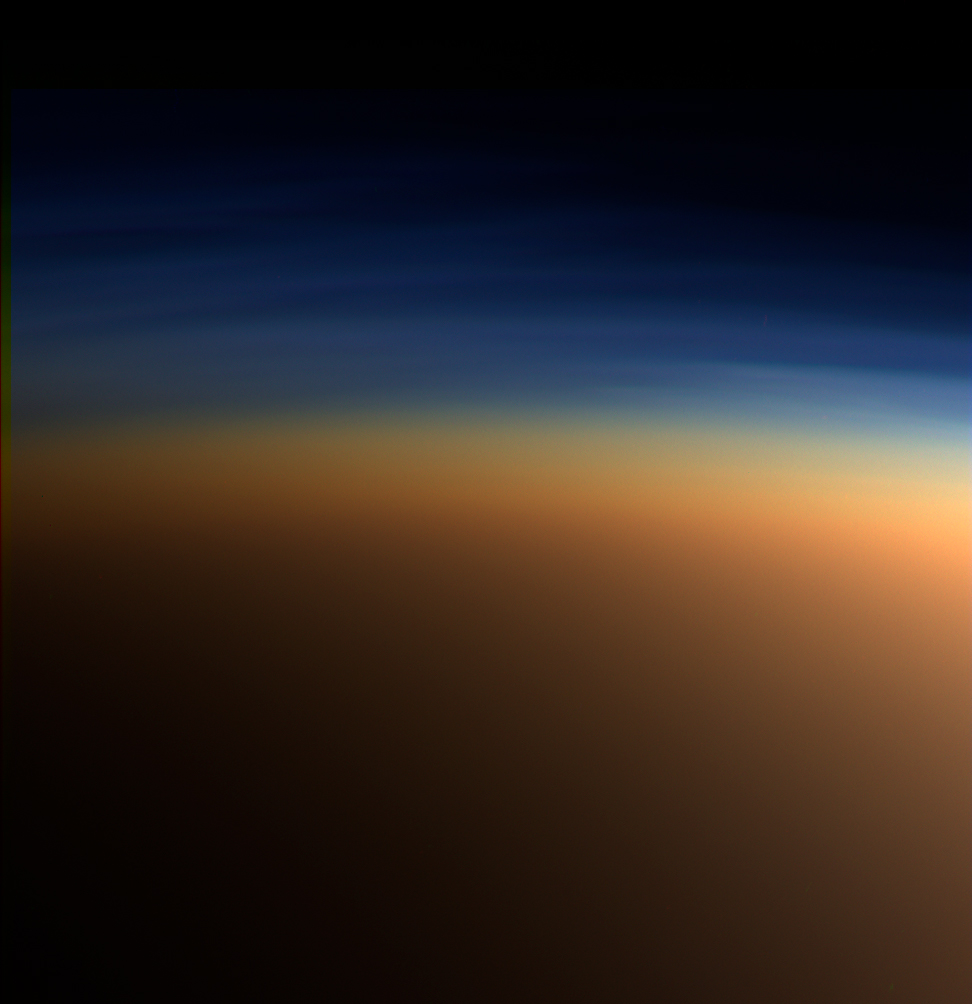
A true-color image of layers of haze in Titan's atmosphere.

Titan has by far the densest atmosphere of any moon. The Titanian atmosphere is in fact denser than Earth's, with a surface pressure of 147 kPa, one and a half times that of the Earth. The atmosphere is 94.2% nitrogen, 5.65% methane, and 0.099% hydrogen, with the remaining 1.6% composed of other gases such as hydrocarbons (including ethane, diacetylene, methylacetylene, cyanoacetylene, acetylene, propane), argon, carbon dioxide, carbon monoxide, cyanogen, hydrogen cyanide and helium.

The hydrocarbons are thought to form in Titan's upper atmosphere in reactions resulting from the breakup of methane by the Sun's ultraviolet light, producing a thick orange smog. Titan has no magnetic field and sometimes orbits outside Saturn's magnetosphere, directly exposing it to the solar wind. This may ionize and carry away some molecules from the top of the atmosphere.

Titan's atmosphere supports an opaque cloud layer that obscures Titan's surface features at visible wavelengths. The haze that can be seen in the adjacent picture contributes to the moon's anti-greenhouse effect and lowers the temperature by reflecting sunlight away from the satellite. The thick atmosphere blocks most visible wavelength light from the Sun and other sources from reaching Titan's surface.

==== Triton ====
Triton, Neptune's largest moon, has a tenuous nitrogen atmosphere with small amounts of methane. Tritonian atmospheric pressure is about 1Pa. The surface temperature is at least 35.6 K, with the nitrogen atmosphere in equilibrium with nitrogen ice on Triton's surface.

Triton has increased in absolute temperature by 5% since 1989 to 1998. A similar rise of temperature on Earth would be equal to about 11 °C (20 °F) increase in temperature in nine years. "At least since 1989, Triton has been undergoing a period of global warming. Percentage-wise, it's a very large increase," said James L. Elliot, who published the report.

Triton is approaching an unusually warm summer season that only happens once every few hundred years. Elliot and his colleagues believe that Triton's warming trend could be driven by seasonal changes in the absorption of solar energy by its polar ice caps. One suggestion for this warming is that it is a result of frost patterns changing on its surface. Another is that ice albedo has changed, allowing for more heat from the Sun to be absorbed. Bonnie J. Buratti et al. argue the changes in temperature are a result of deposition of dark, red material from geological processes on the moon, such as massive venting. Because Triton's Bond albedo is among the highest within the Solar System, it is sensitive to small variations in spectral albedo.

=== Pluto ===
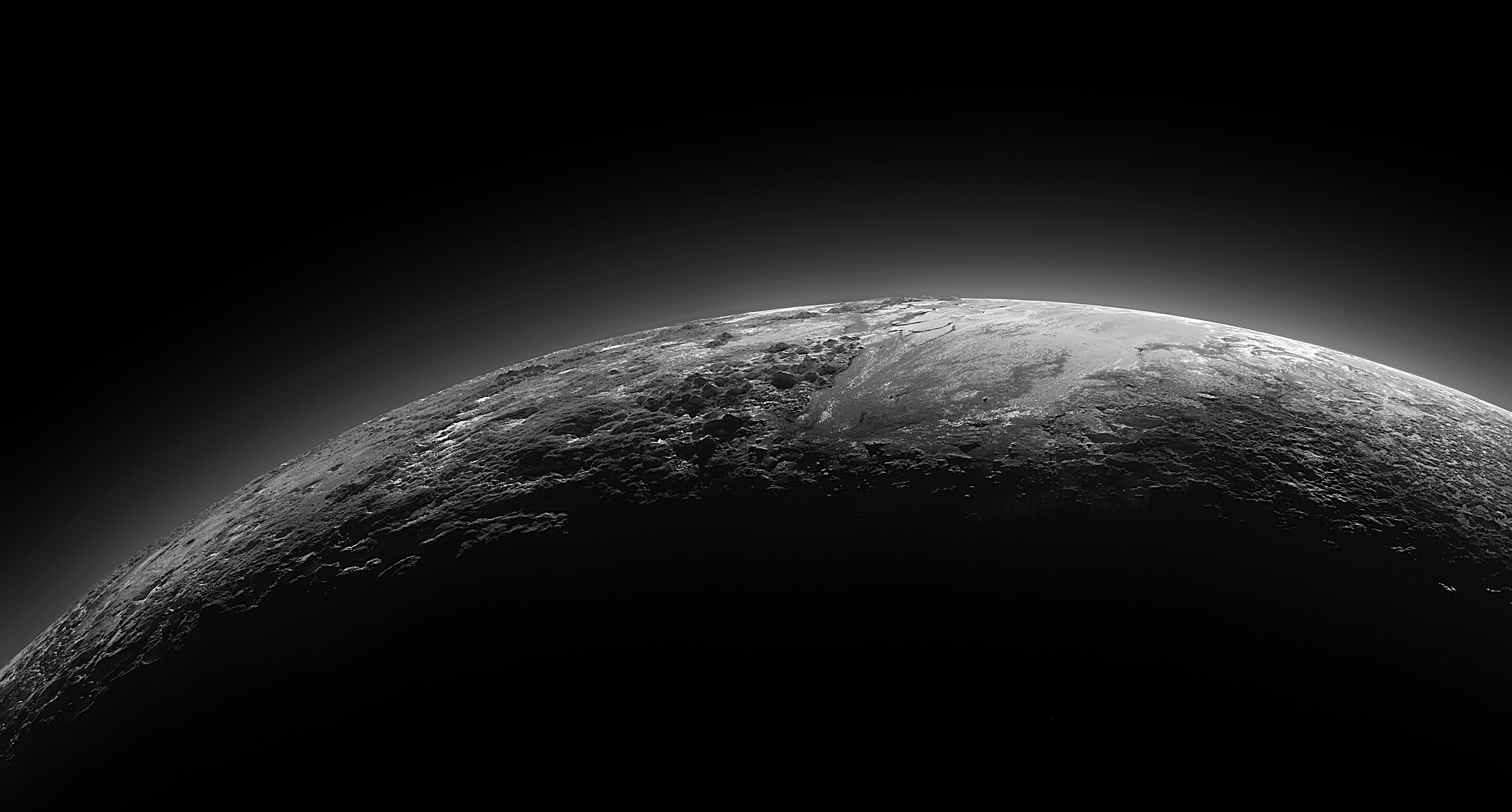
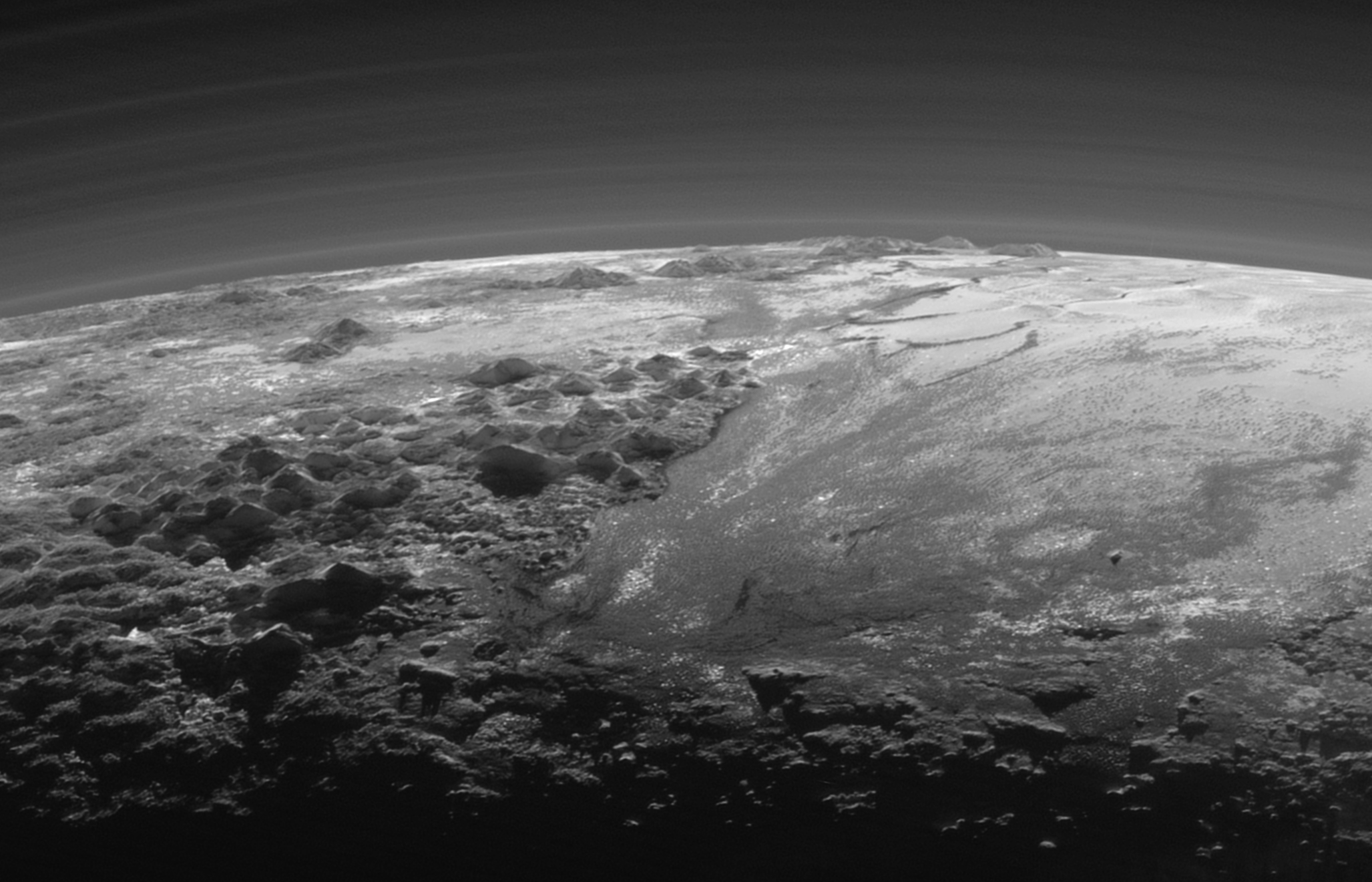
Pluto - Norgay Montes (left-foreground); Hillary Montes (left-skyline); Sputnik Planitia (right)
Near-sunset view includes several layers of atmospheric haze.

Pluto has an extremely thin atmosphere that consists of nitrogen, methane, and carbon monoxide, derived from the ices on its surface. Two models show that the atmosphere does not completely freeze and collapse when Pluto moves further from the Sun on its extremely elliptical orbit. However, some other models do show this. Pluto needs 248 years for one complete orbit, and has been observed for less than one third of that time.

It has an average distance of 39 AU from the Sun, hence in-depth data from Pluto is sparse and difficult to gather. Temperature is inferred indirectly for Pluto; when it passes in front of a star, observers note how fast the light drops off. From this, they deduce the density of the atmosphere, and that is used as an indicator of temperature.

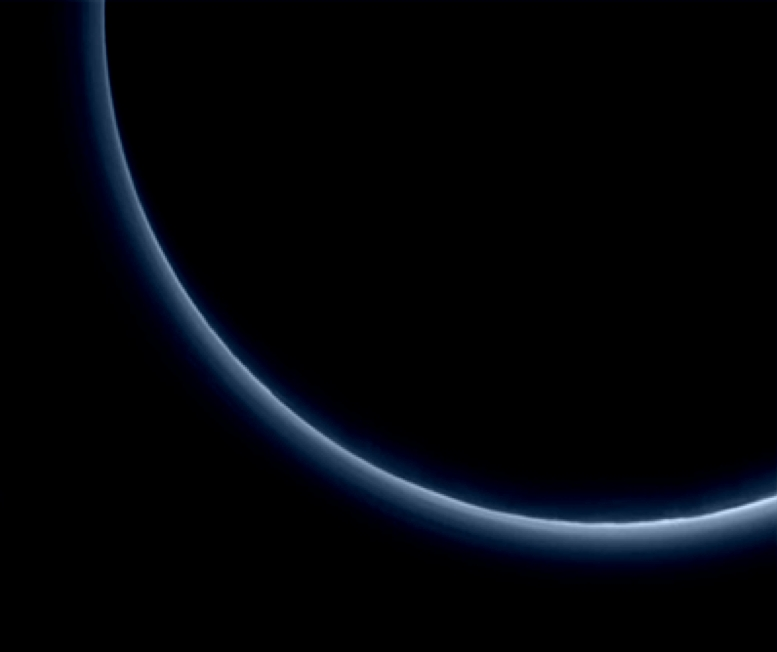
Pluto's atmosphere backlit by the Sun

One such occultation event happened in 1988. Observations of a second occultation on August 20, 2002 suggest that Pluto's atmospheric pressure has tripled, indicating a warming of about 2 °C (3.6 °F), as predicted by Hansen and Paige. The warming is "likely not connected with that of the Earth," says Jay Pasachoff.

One astronomer has speculated the warming may be a result of eruptive activity, but it is more likely Pluto's temperature is heavily influenced by its elliptical orbit. It was closest to the Sun in 1989 (perihelion) and has slowly receded since. If it has any thermal inertia, it is expected to warm for a while after it passes perihelion.

"This warming trend on Pluto could easily last for another 13 years," says David J. Tholen. It has also been suggested that a darkening of surface ice may also be the cause, but additional data and modeling is needed. Frost distribution on the surface of Pluto is significantly affected by the dwarf planet's high obliquity.

== Brown dwarfs ==
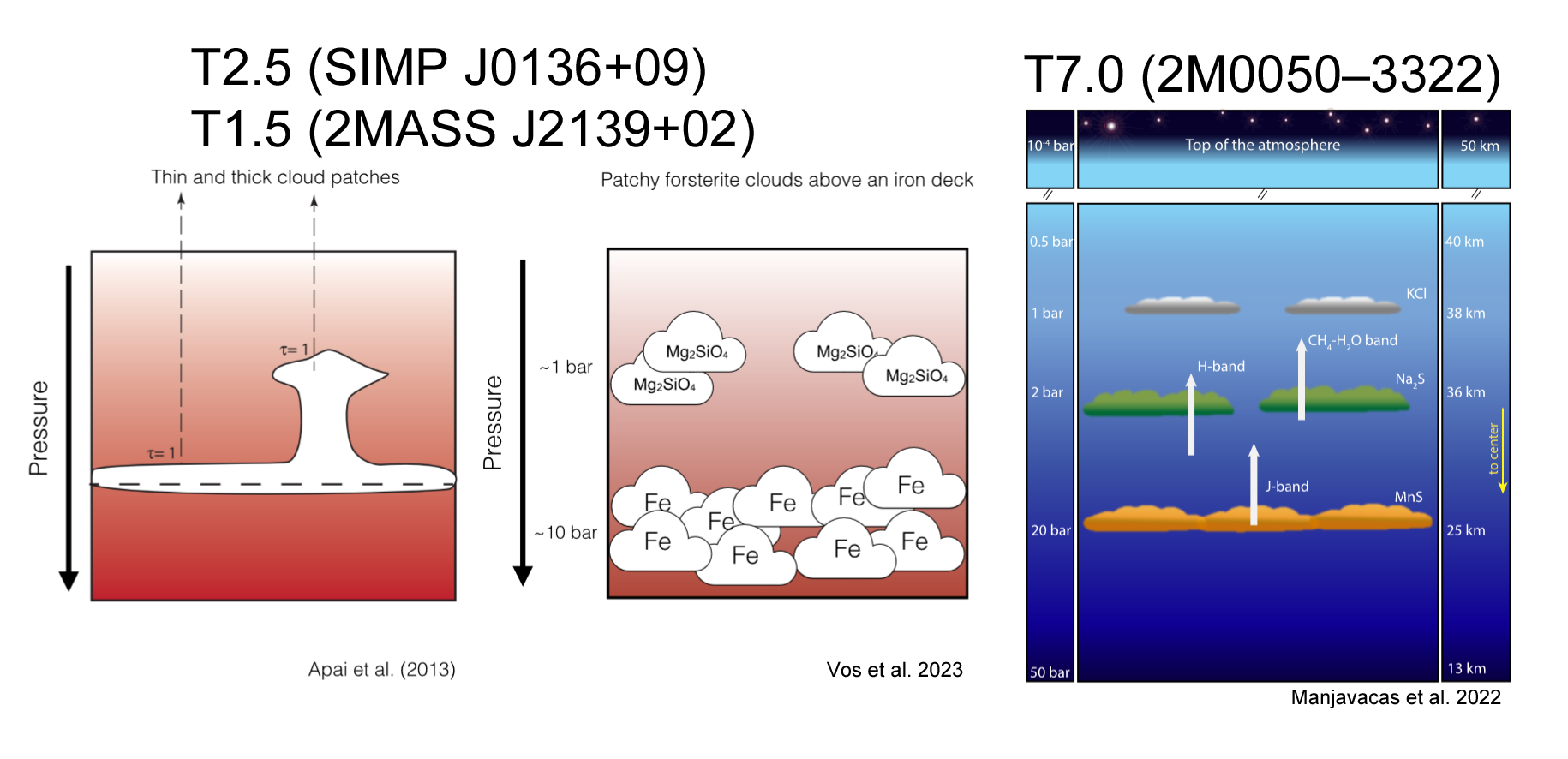
Cloud models for the early T-type brown dwarfs SIMP J0136+09 and 2MASS J2139+02 (left two panels) and the late T-type brown dwarf 2M0050–3322.

Brown dwarfs have an atmosphere that produces a spectrum from late M-type, over L-type, T-type and finally arriving at Y-dwarf with decreasing temperature. The atmosphere is hydrogen rich and a brown dwarf is 70% hydrogen by mass. Several chemical compounds are present in the atmosphere of brown dwarfs and their importance in shaping the spectrum changes with temperature. Methane and water vapor for example becomes more prominent for colder brown dwarfs.

The physical properties can influence the atmosphere significantly. A low surface gravity of low-mass brown dwarfs or planetary-mass objects can bring the atmosphere in a chemical disequilibrium. Metallicity can influence the amount of methane in the atmosphere and in the extreme case of WISEA 1810−1010 the methane feature is undetectable.

Several models for clouds in the atmosphere of brown dwarfs exist. Near the L/T transition these clouds consists of iron with varying thickness, or of a patchy silicate cloud layer above a thick iron cloud layer. Late T-dwarfs to early Y-dwarfs on the other hand have clouds made from chromium and potassium chloride, as well as several sulfides. At the lowest temperature of some Y-dwarfs water clouds and possibly ammonium dihydrogen phosphate clouds might exist.

Free-floating brown dwarfs rotate faster than Jupiter and studies have inferred the presence of zonal winds. The brown dwarf 2MASS J1047+21 has a rotation period of 1.77 ± 0.04 hours and it has strong winds with speeds of 650±310 m/s proceeding eastwards.

== Exoplanets ==
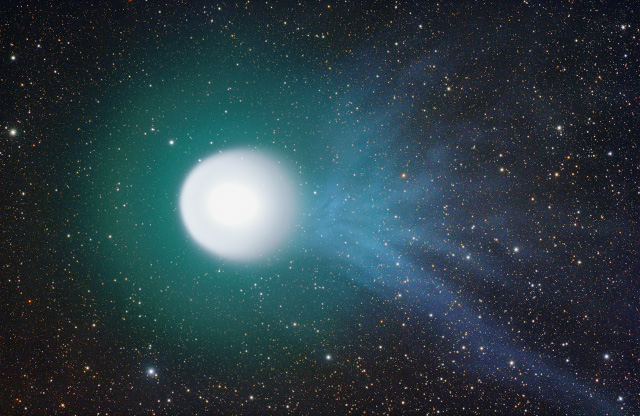
A telescopic image of Comet 17P/Holmes in 2007

Several planets outside the Solar System (exoplanets) have been observed to have atmospheres. At the present time, most atmosphere detections are of hot Jupiters or hot Neptunes that orbit very close to their star and thus have heated and extended atmospheres. Observations of exoplanet atmospheres come from two methods. First, transmission photometry or spectra detect the light that passes through a planet's atmosphere as it transits in front of its star. Second, the direct emission from a planet atmosphere may be detected by differencing the star plus planet light obtained during most of the planet's orbit with the light of just the star during secondary eclipse (when the exoplanet is behind its star).

The first observation of an extrasolar planetary atmosphere was made in 2001. Sodium in the atmosphere of the planet HD 209458 b was detected during a set of four transits of the planet across its star. Later observations with the Hubble Space Telescope showed an enormous ellipsoidal envelope of hydrogen, carbon and oxygen around the planet. This envelope reaches temperatures of 10,000 K.

The planet is estimated to be losing (1–5)×10^{8} kg of hydrogen per second. This type of atmosphere loss may be common to all planets orbiting Sun-like stars closer than around 0.1 AU. HD 209458 b is thought to have water vapor in its atmosphere. Sodium and water vapour has also been observed in the atmosphere of HD 189733 b, another hot gas giant planet.

In October 2013, the detection of clouds in the atmosphere of Kepler-7b was announced. In December 2013, clouds were detected in the atmospheres of Gliese 436 b and Gliese 1214 b.

In May 2017, glints of light from Earth, seen as twinkling from an orbiting satellite a million kilometres away, were found to be reflected light from ice crystals in the atmosphere. The technology used to determine this may be useful in studying the atmospheres of distant worlds, including those of exoplanets.

=== Atmospheric composition ===
In 2001, sodium was detected in the atmosphere of the hot Jupiter HD 209458 b.

In 2008, water, carbon monoxide, carbon dioxide and methane were detected in the atmosphere of the hot Jupiter HD 189733 b.

In 2013, water was detected in the atmospheres of the hot Jupiters HD 209458 b, XO-1b, WASP-12b, WASP-17b, and WASP-19b.

In July 2014, NASA announced finding very dry atmospheres on three exoplanets (the hot Jupiters HD 189733b, HD 209458b and WASP-12b) orbiting Sun-like stars.

In September 2014, NASA reported that HAT-P-11b is the first Neptune-sized exoplanet known to have a relatively cloud-free atmosphere and, as well, the first time molecules of any kind have been found, specifically water vapor, on such a relatively small exoplanet.

The presence of molecular oxygen (O_{2}) may be detectable by ground-based telescopes, and it can be produced by geophysical processes, as well as a byproduct of photosynthesis by life forms, so although encouraging, O_{2} is not a reliable biosignature. In fact, planets with high concentration of O_{2} in their atmosphere may be uninhabitable. Abiogenesis in the presence of massive amounts of atmospheric oxygen could be difficult because early organisms relied on the free energy available in redox reactions involving a variety of hydrogen compounds; on an O_{2}-rich planet, organisms would have to compete with the oxygen for this free energy.

In June 2015, NASA reported that the hot Jupiter WASP-33b has a stratosphere. Ozone and hydrocarbons absorb large amounts of ultraviolet radiation, heating the upper parts of atmospheres that contain them, creating a temperature inversion and a stratosphere. These molecules are destroyed at the temperatures of hot exoplanets, creating doubt if the hot exoplanets could have a stratosphere. A temperature inversion, and stratosphere was identified on WASP-33b caused by titanium oxide, which is a strong absorber of visible and ultraviolet radiation, and can only exist as a gas in a hot atmosphere. WASP-33b is the hottest exoplanet known, with a temperature of 3,200 °C (5,790 °F) and is approximately four and a half times the mass of Jupiter.

In February 2016, it was announced that NASA's Hubble Space Telescope had detected hydrogen and helium (and suggestions of hydrogen cyanide), but no water vapor, in the atmosphere of 55 Cancri e, the first time the atmosphere of a super-Earth exoplanet was analyzed successfully.

In September 2019, two independent research studies concluded, from Hubble Space Telescope data, that there were significant amounts of water in the atmosphere of the sub-Neptune K2-18b, the first such discovery for a planet within a star's habitable zone.

In August 2022, NASA published the discovery by the James Webb Space Telescope of carbon dioxide in the atmosphere of the hot Jupiter WASP-39b.

In 2024, the first discovery of a steam H_{2}O atmosphere was found around the sub-Neptune GJ 9827 d.

==== Missing Methane Problem ====
Carbon monoxide should be replaced by methane as the dominant carbon-bearing molecule in the atmosphere of exoplanets at temperatures below 1000 K. While methane is detected in solar system objects, young directly imaged exoplanets and in free-floating brown dwarfs (T/Y-dwarfs), it is rarely detected in transiting exoplanets. This observation was dubbed the Missing Methane Problem. Some studies tried to explain this with a depletion of methane. The most solid detection of methane is in the atmosphere of the warm Jupiter (825 K) WASP-80b, which was detected with NIRCam.

This detection is in agreement with models that do not require a strong methane depletion. This detection suggested that other instruments did not have the wavelength coverage or precision needed to detect methane. Non-detection of methane in HD 209458b on the other hand showed that the missing methane problem cannot be resolved for all exoplanets with JWST and an explanation for the missing methane is required. Explanations often involve a high metallicity and a low carbon-to-oxygen ratio.

A similar problem exists for the detection of ammonia. Methane and ammonia is detected in free-floating Y-dwarfs (T_{eff}<400 K), such as WISE 0359−5401. Transiting exoplanets on the other hand do rarely show ammonia. For example the ~300 K exoplanets K2-18b showed a depletion of methane and ammonia and more recent observations with NIRISS and NIRSpec was able to resolve the methane problem for K2-18b. The observations showed strong absorption due to methane, but was not able to detect any ammonia in K2-18b.

The research team explained this missing ammonia with an ocean that absorbs certain gases. Other researchers are more cautious about this ocean claim. One problem is that ammonia and methane absorption overlap in the near-infrared. Ammonia absorption could be mistaken as methane and mid-infrared detections of ammonia are much clearer, such as in WISE 0359−5401 with MIRI.

Another problem exists for phosphine (PH_{3}) which is a strong absorber in Jupiter, but does not appear in similar cold free-floating T- and Y-dwarfs, such as WISE 0855−0714, WISE 0359−5401, WISE 1828+2650 and 2MASS 0415−0935. One explanation is that the behaviour of phosphorus in the atmosphere of brown dwarfs to giant exoplanets is not well understood.

=== Atmospheric circulation ===
The atmospheric circulation of planets that rotate more slowly or have a thicker atmosphere allows more heat to flow to the poles which reduces the temperature differences between the poles and the equator.

=== Winds ===
Winds of over 2 km/s—which is seven times the speed of sound or 20 times faster than the fastest ever winds known on Earth—have been discovered flowing around the planet HD 189733b.

=== Clouds ===
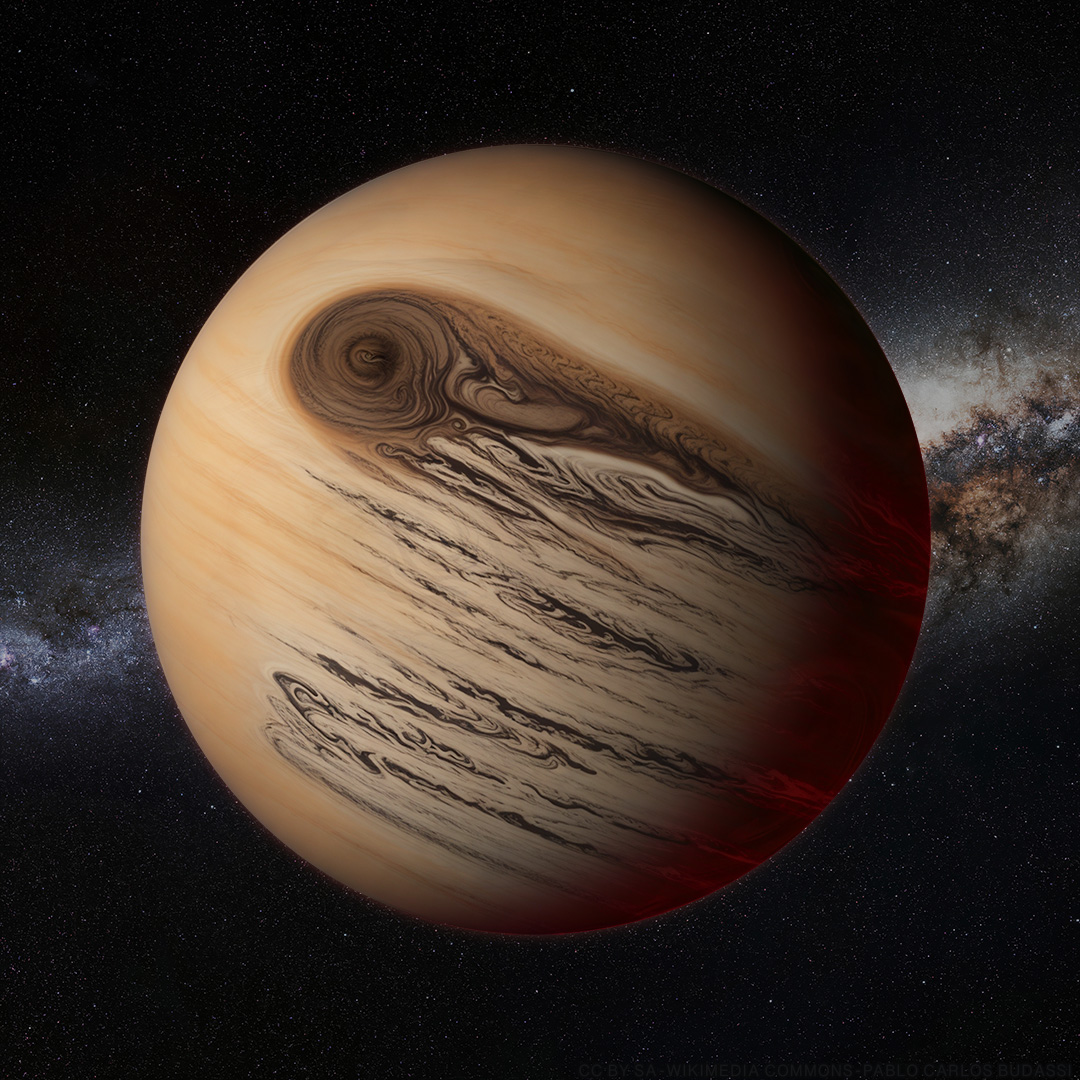
An artist's impression of a gas giant with patchy silicate clouds on top of an iron cloud deck.

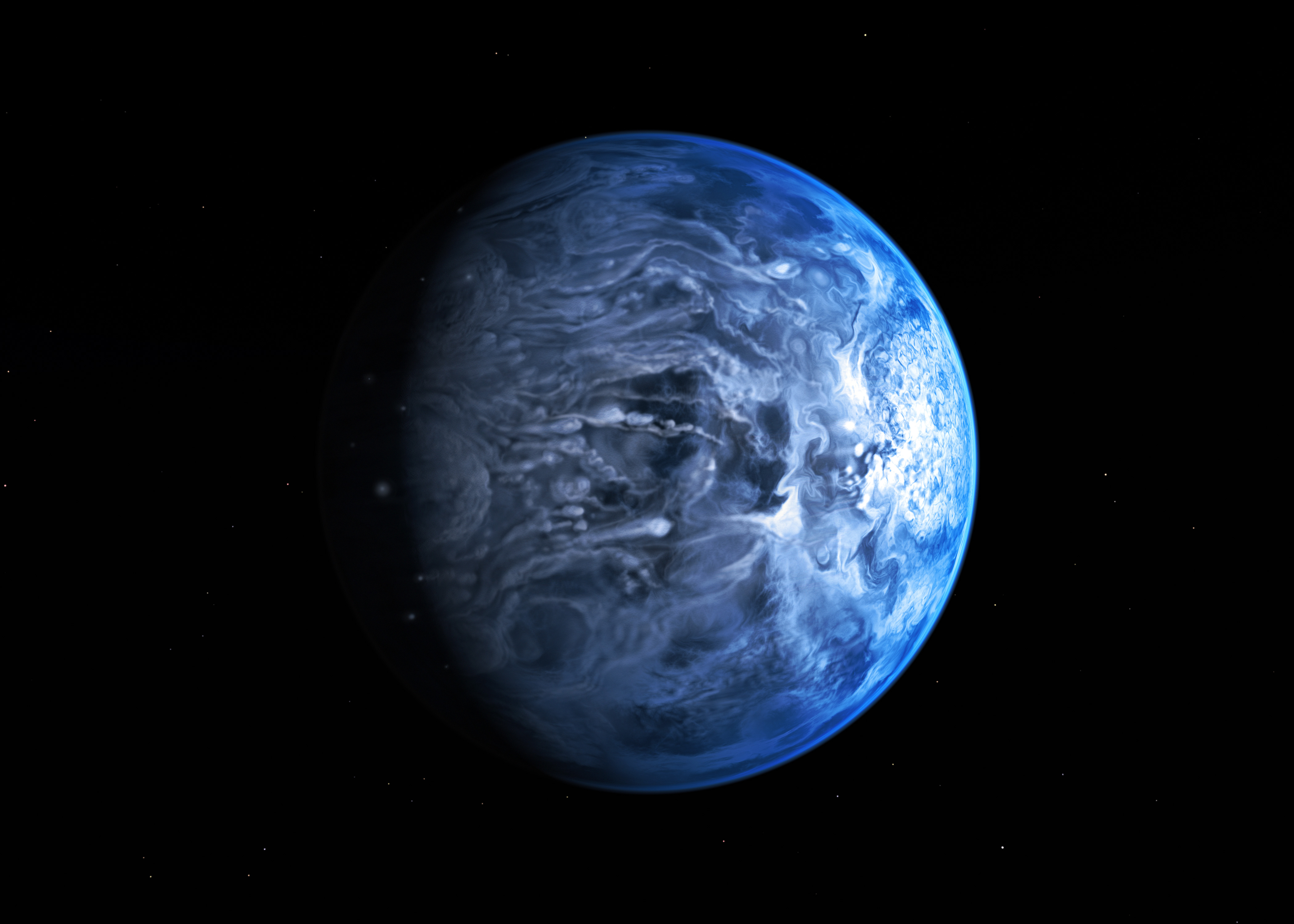
HD 189733b, which is a hot Jupiter. This artist's impression shows its predicted blue color and its night- and dayside clouds.

The composition of clouds in gas giants depend on temperature. A cloud layer does "sink" with decreasing temperature. This way one exoplanet might have a cloud layer at a higher pressure (lower altitude) compared to a warmer exoplanet. High altitude clouds often block light coming from deeper layers of the atmosphere, including chemical absorption features. Weaker than normal absorption features is the main method to detect the presence of clouds via transmission spectroscopy.

In some cases the absorption from the clouds can be directly observed, such as quartz-clouds on WASP-17b with JWST. One way to predict the appearance of a gas giant is the Sudarsky's gas giant classification. But this classification scheme is over two decades old and more recent models sometimes predict thin clouds for class III and class IV. This classification also does not consider ultra-hot Jupiters, which do have nightside clouds. Relative cloud-free atmospheres also exist.

Similar to brown dwarfs the composition at hotter temperature (class V or >900 K) is a thick iron cloud deck with silicate clouds (quartz, corundum, fosterite and/or enstatite) on top. This top layer can be patchy and cover 70-90% of the planet. At lower temperatures (class III-IV or 400-1,300 K) the iron and silicate clouds sink deep into the atmosphere and thin clouds made of chromium, potassium chloride and especially sulfides (manganese sulfide, sodium sulfide and zinc sulfide) become more important.

At low temperatures (class II <400 K) water clouds and possibly ammonium dihydrogen phosphate clouds might exist. But lower layers of clouds of sulfides and potassium chloride should exist at this temperature. Jupiter and Saturn-like atmospheres (class I or <150 K) are dominated by ammonia clouds, but lower layers of water clouds might exist.

A newer type of exoplanets, called ultra-hot Jupiters have a temperature above 2,000 K and have a cloud-free dayside with molecules often dissociated into atoms or ions. A wide variety of atomic lines were detected in the transmission spectra of the ultra-hot Jupiters. The nightside can be up to 2,500 K colder than the dayside and in WASP-18b this temperature drop causes clouds to form at the terminator. At the equator of the terminator, which forms clouds on WASP-18b (in the west seen from the dayside) the cloud top is made of thin layers dominated by titanium dioxide, corundum (aluminium oxide), perovskite (calcium titanate) and iron.

The majority of the vertical portion of the cloud is made up of clouds of enstatite, fosterite, periclase (magnesium oxide), quartz, iron and inclusion of other material. The cloud bottom changes from quartz dominated, to iron, then corundum and then perovskite dominated. These bottom layers have large particle sizes of about 60 μm. At other positions of the terminator these clouds change their composition and particle size. The cloud-free dayside and the cloudy terminator/nightside would make these ultra-hot Jupiters look similar to an eyeball planet.

In October 2013, the detection of clouds in the atmosphere of Kepler-7b was announced, and, in December 2013, also in the atmospheres of GJ 436 b and GJ 1214 b.

=== Precipitation ===
Precipitation in the form of liquid (rain) or solid (snow) varies in composition depending on atmospheric temperature, pressure, composition, and altitude. Hot atmospheres could have iron rain, molten-glass rain, and rain made from rocky minerals such as enstatite, corundum, spinel, and wollastonite. Deep in the atmospheres of gas giants, it could rain diamonds and helium containing dissolved neon.

=== Abiotic oxygen ===
There are geological and atmospheric processes that produce free oxygen, so the detection of oxygen is not necessarily an indication of life.

The processes of life result in a mixture of chemicals that are not in chemical equilibrium but there are also abiotic disequilibrium processes that need to be considered. The most robust atmospheric biosignature is often considered to be molecular oxygen (O_{2}) and its photochemical byproduct ozone (O_{3}). The photolysis of water (H_{2}O) by UV rays followed by hydrodynamic escape of hydrogen can lead to a build-up of oxygen in planets close to their star undergoing runaway greenhouse effect. For planets in the habitable zone, it was thought that water photolysis would be strongly limited by cold-trapping of water vapour in the lower atmosphere.

The extent of H_{2}O cold-trapping depends strongly on the amount of non-condensible gases in the atmosphere such as nitrogen N_{2} and argon. In the absence of such gases, the likelihood of build-up of oxygen also depends in complex ways on the planet's accretion history, internal chemistry, atmospheric dynamics, and orbital state. Therefore, oxygen, on its own, cannot be considered a robust biosignature.

The ratio of nitrogen and argon to oxygen could be detected by studying thermal phase curves or by transit transmission spectroscopy measurement of the spectral Rayleigh scattering slope in a clear-sky (i.e. aerosol-free) atmosphere.

== Life ==
=== Methane ===
Detection of methane in astronomical bodies is of interest to science and technology, as it may be evidence of extraterrestrial life (biosignature), it may help provide organic ingredients for life to form, and also, methane could be used as a fuel or rocket propellant for future robotic and crewed missions in the Solar System.

- Mercury – the tenuous atmosphere contains trace amounts of methane.
- Venus – the atmosphere may contain a large amount of methane from 60 km (37 mi) to the surface according to data collected by the Pioneer Venus Large Probe Neutral Mass Spectrometer
- Moon – traces are outgassed from the surface

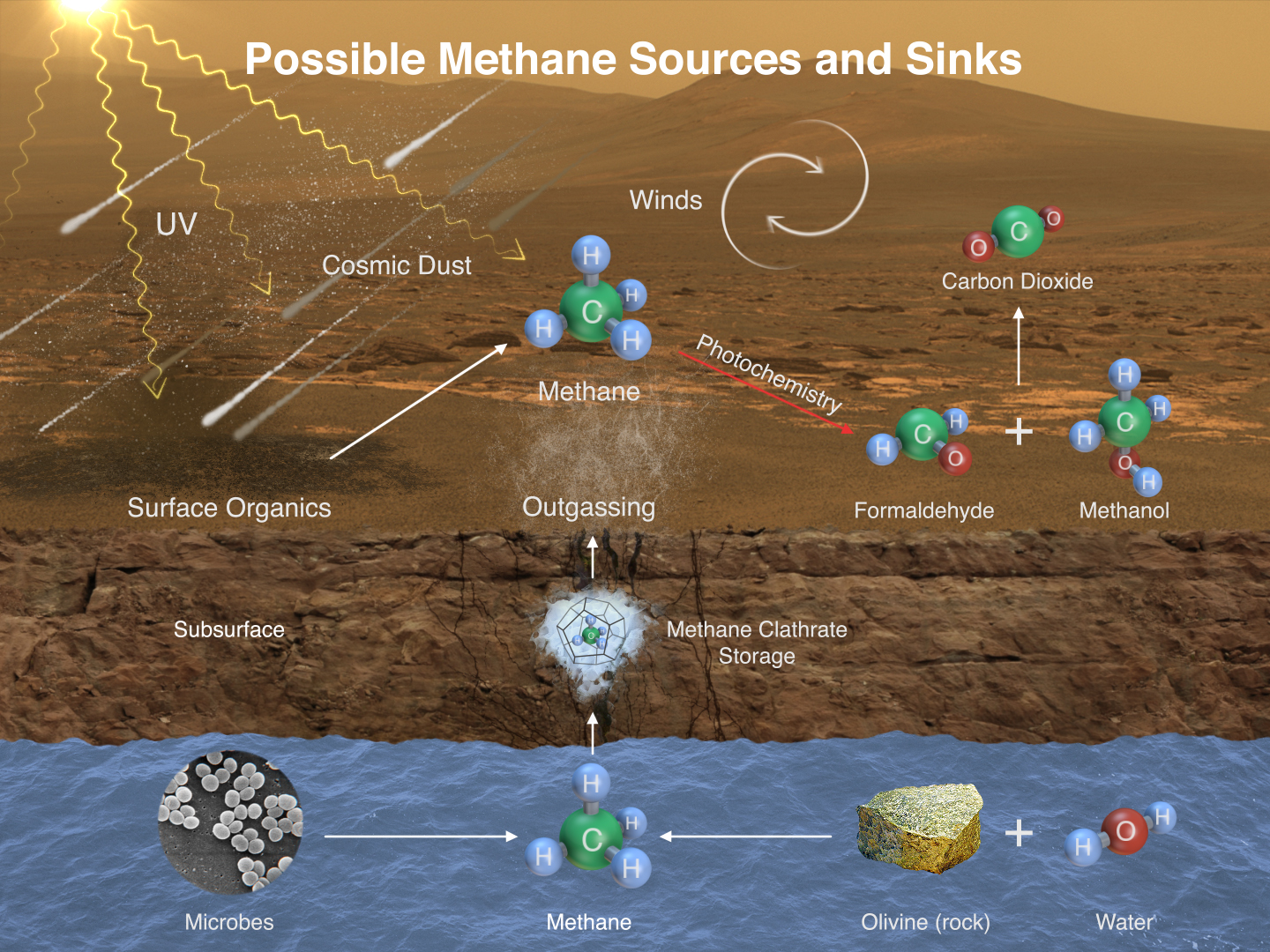
Methane (CH_{4}) on Mars – potential sources and sinks.

- Mars – the Martian atmosphere contains 10 nmol/mol methane. The source of methane on Mars has not been determined. Research suggests that methane may come from volcanoes, fault lines, or methanogens, that it may be a byproduct of electrical discharges from dust devils and dust storms, or that it may be the result of UV radiation. In January 2009, NASA scientists announced that they had discovered that the planet often vents methane into the atmosphere in specific areas, leading some to speculate this may be a sign of biological activity below the surface. The Curiosity rover, which landed on Mars in August 2012, can distinguish between different isotopologues of methane; but even if the mission determines that microscopic Martian life is the source of the methane, it probably resides far below the surface, beyond the rover's reach. The first measurements with the Tunable Laser Spectrometer (TLS) indicated that there is less than 5 ppb of methane at the landing site. On 16 December 2014, NASA reported the Curiosity rover detected a "tenfold spike", likely localized, in the amount of methane in the Martian atmosphere. Sample measurements taken "a dozen times over 20 months" showed increases in late 2013 and early 2014, averaging "7 parts of methane per billion in the atmosphere." Before and after that, readings averaged around one-tenth that level. The spikes in concentration suggest that Mars is episodically producing or releasing methane from an unknown source. The ExoMars Trace Gas Orbiter will perform measurements of methane starting in April 2018, as well as its decomposition products such as formaldehyde and methanol.
- Jupiter – the atmosphere contains 3000 ± 1000 ppm methane
- Saturn – the atmosphere contains 4500 ± 2000 ppm methane
  - Enceladus – the atmosphere contains 1.7% methane
  - Iapetus
  - Titan – the atmosphere contains 1.6% methane and thousands of methane lakes have been detected on the surface. In the upper atmosphere, methane is converted into more complex molecules including acetylene, a process that also produces molecular hydrogen. There is evidence that acetylene and hydrogen are recycled into methane near the surface. This suggests the presence of either an exotic catalyst or an unknown form of methanogenic life. Methane showers, probably prompted by changing seasons, have also been observed. On October 24, 2014, methane was found in polar clouds on Titan.
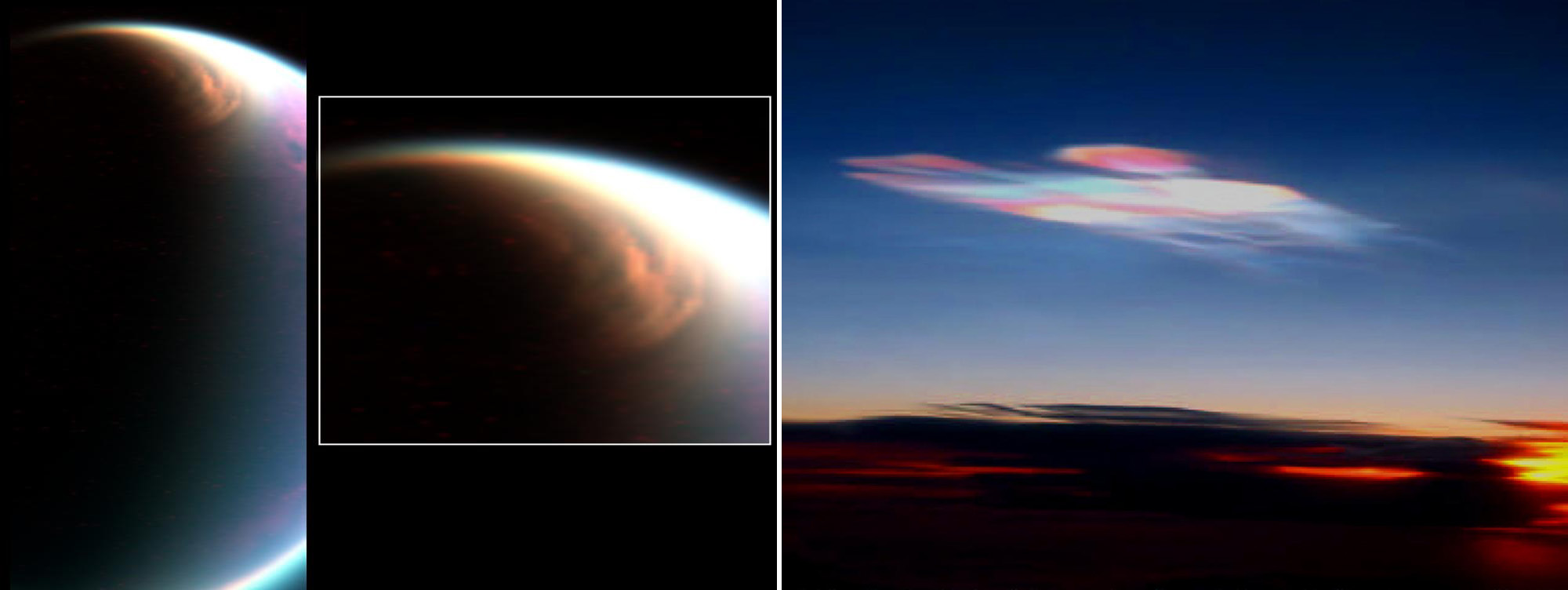
Polar clouds, made of methane, on Titan (left) compared with polar clouds on Earth (right).
- Uranus – the atmosphere contains 2.3% methane
  - Ariel – methane is believed to be a constituent of Ariel's surface ice
  - Miranda
  - Oberon – about 20% of Oberon's surface ice is composed of methane-related carbon/nitrogen compounds
  - Titania – about 20% of Titania's surface ice is composed of methane-related organic compounds
  - Umbriel – methane is a constituent of Umbriel's surface ice
- Neptune – the atmosphere contains 1.5 ± 0.5% methane
  - Triton – Triton has a tenuous nitrogen atmosphere with small amounts of methane near the surface.
- Pluto – spectroscopic analysis of Pluto's surface reveals it to contain traces of methane
  - Charon – methane is believed present on Charon, but it is not completely confirmed
- Eris – infrared light from the object revealed the presence of methane ice
- Halley's Comet
- Comet Hyakutake – terrestrial observations found ethane and methane in the comet
- Extrasolar planets – methane was detected on extrasolar planet HD 189733b; this is the first detection of an organic compound on a planet outside the solar system. Its origin is unknown, since the planet's high temperature (700 °C) would normally favor the formation of carbon monoxide instead. Research indicates that meteoroids slamming against exoplanet atmospheres could add hydrocarbon gases such as methane, making the exoplanets look as though they are inhabited by life, even if they are not.
- Interstellar clouds
- The atmospheres of M-type stars.

== See also ==
- Coma (cometary)
- Extraterrestrial sky
- Hydrosphere
- Orbital forcing
- Planetary surface
- Solar cycle
- Stellar atmosphere
- Exometeorology
- Cosmic shoreline
