= Chemical cycling =

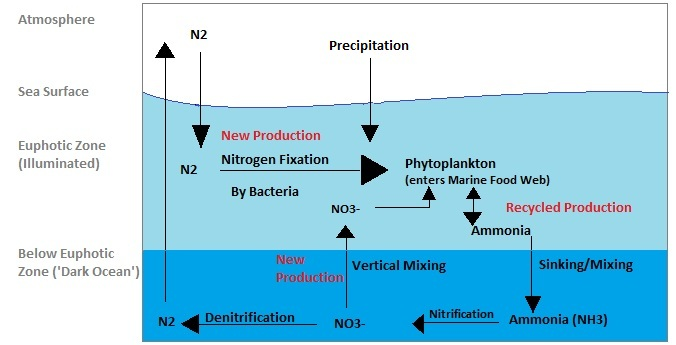
An example chemical cycle, a schematic representation of a Nitrogen cycle on Earth. This process results in the continual recycling of nitrogen gas involving the ocean.

Chemical cycling describes systems of repeated circulation of chemicals between other compounds, states and materials, and back to their original state, that occurs in space, and on many objects in space including the Earth. Active chemical cycling is known to occur in stars, many planets and natural satellites.

Chemical cycling plays a large role in sustaining planetary atmospheres, liquids and biological processes and can greatly influence weather and climate. Some chemical cycles release renewable energy, others may give rise to complex chemical reactions, organic compounds and prebiotic chemistry. On terrestrial bodies such as the Earth, chemical cycles involving the lithosphere are known as geochemical cycles. Ongoing geochemical cycles are one of the main attributes of geologically active worlds. A chemical cycle involving a biosphere is known as a biogeochemical cycle.

== The Sun, other stars and star systems ==
In most hydrogen-fusing stars, including the Sun, a chemical cycle involved in stellar nucleosynthesis occurs which is known as a carbon-nitrogen-oxygen or (CNO cycle). In addition to this cycle, stars also have a helium cycle. Various cycles involving gas and dust have been found to occur in galaxies.

== Venus ==
The majority of known chemical cycles on Venus involve its dense atmosphere and compounds of carbon and sulphur, the most significant being a strong carbon dioxide cycle. The lack of a complete carbon cycle including a geochemical carbon cycle, for example, is thought to be a cause of its runaway greenhouse effect, due to the lack of a substantial carbon sink. Sulphur cycles including sulphur oxide cycles also occur, sulphur oxide in the upper atmosphere and results in the presence of sulfuric acid in turn returns to oxides through photolysis. Indications also suggest an ozone cycle on Venus similar to that of Earth's.

== Earth ==
Earth's water cycle.

A number of different types of chemical cycles occur on Earth. Biogeochemical cycles play an important role in sustaining the biosphere. Notable active chemical cycles on Earth include:

- Carbon cycle – consisting of an atmospheric carbon cycle (and carbon dioxide cycle), terrestrial biological carbon cycle, oceanic carbon cycle and geological carbon cycle
- Nitrogen cycle – which converts nitrogen between its forms through fixation, ammonification, nitrification, and denitrification
- Oxygen cycle and Ozone–oxygen cycle – a biogeochemical cycle of circulating oxygen between the atmosphere, biosphere (the global sum of all ecosystems), and the lithosphere
- Ozone-oxygen cycle – continually regenerates ozone in the atmosphere and converts ultraviolet radiation (UV) into heat
- Water cycle – moves water continuously on, above and below the surface shifting between states of liquid, solution, ice and vapour
- Methane cycle – moves methane between geological and biogeochemical sources and reactions in the atmosphere
- Hydrogen cycle – a biogeochemical cycle brought about by a combination of biological and abiological processes
- Phosphorus cycle – the movement of phosphorus through the lithosphere, hydrosphere, and biosphere
- Sulfur cycle – a biogeochemical process resulting from the mineralization of organic sulfur, oxidation, reduction and incorporation into organic compounds
- Carbonate–silicate cycle transforms silicate rocks to carbonate rocks by weathering and sedimentation and transforms carbonate rocks back into silicates by metamorphism and magmatism.
- Rock cycle – switches rock between its three forms: sedimentary, metamorphic, and igneous
- Mercury cycle – a biogeochemical process in which naturally occurring mercury is bioaccumulated before recombining with sulfur and returning to geological sources as sediments

Other chemical cycles include hydrogen peroxide.

== Mars ==
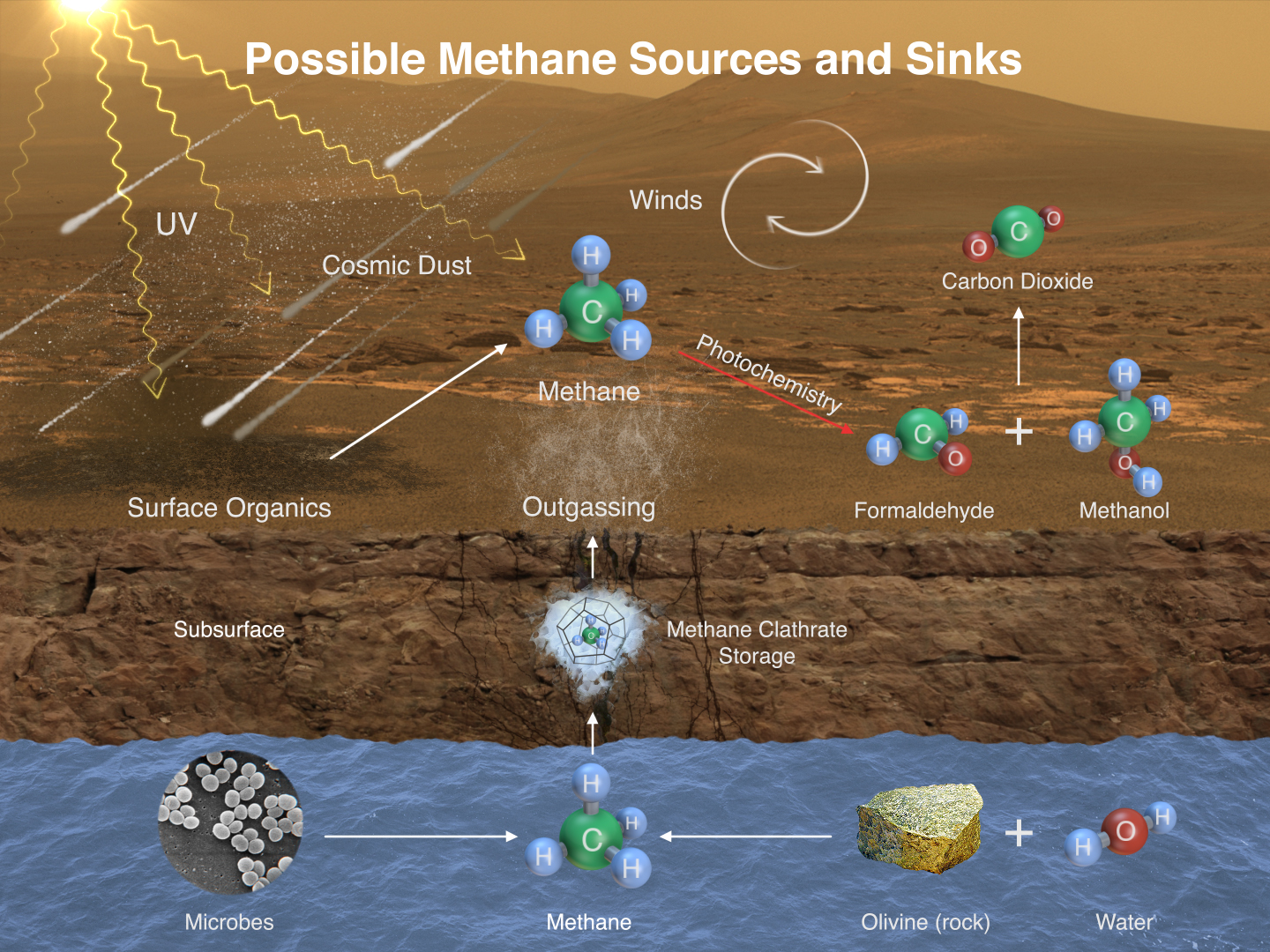
Possible sources of a hypothesized Martian Methane cycle.

Recent evidence suggests that similar chemical cycles to Earth's occur on a lesser scale on Mars, facilitated by the thin atmosphere, including carbon dioxide (and possibly carbon), water, sulphur, methane, oxygen, ozone, and nitrogen cycles. Many studies point to significantly more active chemical cycles on Mars in the past, however the faint young Sun paradox has proved problematic in determining chemical cycles involved in early climate models of the planet.

== Jupiter ==
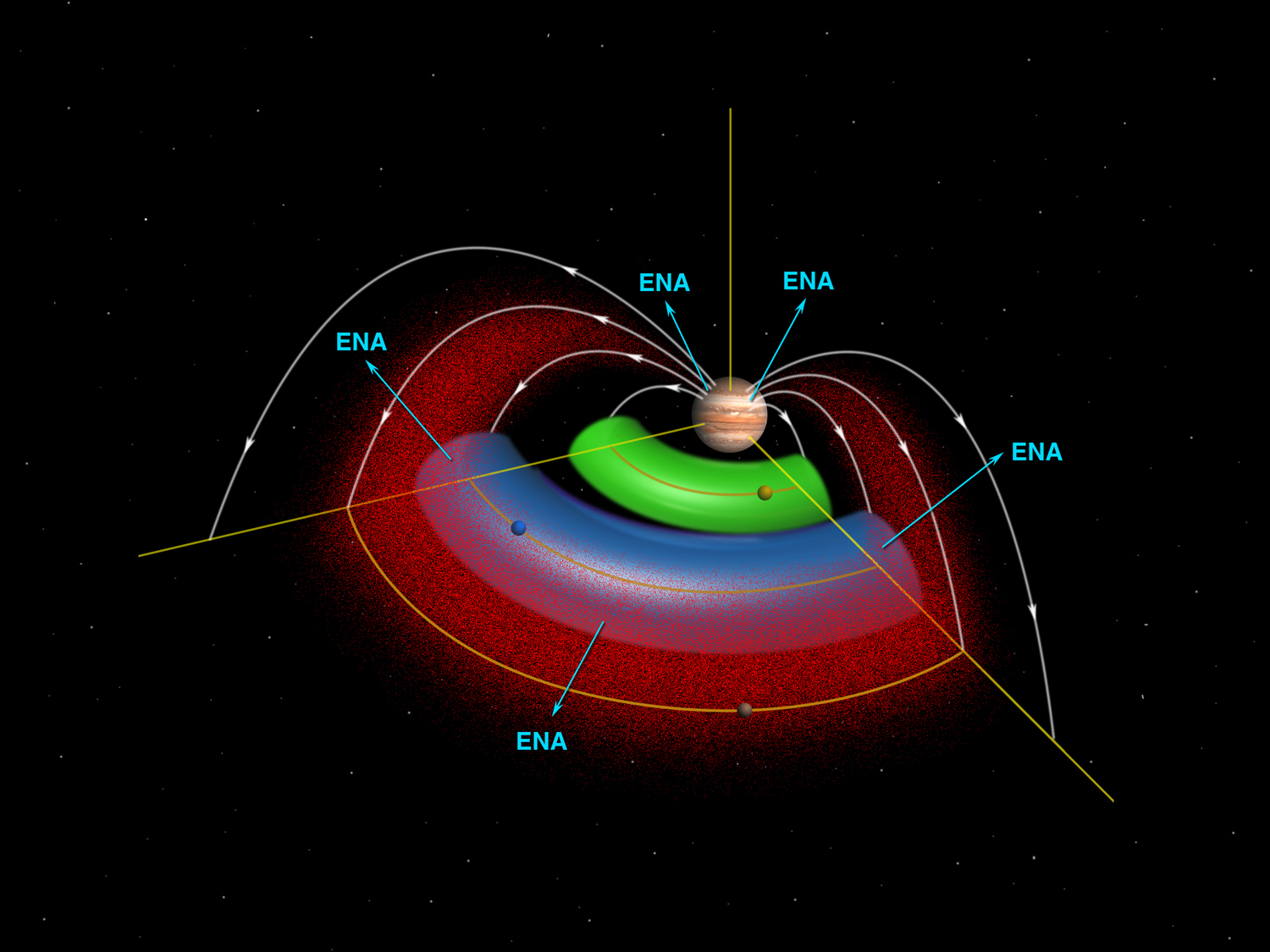
Jupiter's gas toruses generated by Io (green) and Europa (blue)

Jupiter, like all the gas giants, has an atmospheric methane cycle. Recent studies indicate a hydrological cycle of water-ammonia vastly different to the type operating on terrestrial planets like Earth and also a cycle of hydrogen sulfide.

Significant chemical cycles exist on Jupiter's moons. Recent evidence points to Europa possessing several active cycles, most notably a water cycle. Other studies suggest an oxygen and radiation induced carbon dioxide cycle. Io and Europa, appear to have radiolytic sulphur cycles involving their lithospheres. In addition, Europa is thought to have a sulfur dioxide cycle. In addition, the Io plasma torus contributes to a sulphur cycle on Jupiter and Ganymede. Studies also imply active oxygen cycles on Ganymede and oxygen and radiolytic carbon dioxide cycles on Callisto.

== Saturn ==
A graph depicting mechanisms of Titan's methanological cycle.

In addition to Saturn's methane cycle some studies suggest an ammonia cycle induced by photolysis similar to Jupiter's.

The cycles of its moons are of particular interest. Observations by Cassini–Huygens of Titan's atmosphere and interactions with its liquid mantle give rise to several active chemical cycles including a methane, hydrocarbon, hydrogen, and carbon cycles. Enceladus has an active hydrological, silicate and possibly a nitrogen cycle.

== Uranus ==
Uranus has an active methane cycle. Methane is converted to hydrocarbons through photolysis which condenses and as they are heated, release methane which rises to the upper atmosphere.

Studies by Grundy et al. (2006) indicate active carbon cycles operates on Titania, Umbriel and Ariel and Oberon through the ongoing sublimation and deposition of carbon dioxide, though some is lost to space over long periods of time.

== Neptune ==
Neptune's internal heat and convection drives cycles of methane, carbon, and a combination of other volatiles within Triton's lithosphere.

Models predicted the presence of seasonal nitrogen cycles on the moon Triton, however this has not been supported by observations to date.

== Pluto-Charon system ==
Models predict a seasonal nitrogen cycle on Pluto and observations by New Horizons appear to support this.
