= List of exoplanet firsts =

This is a list of exoplanet discoveries that were the first by several criteria, including:

- the detection method used,
- the planet type,
- the planetary system type,
- the star type,

and others.

== The first ==
The choice of "first" depends on definition and confirmation, as below. The three systems detected prior to 1994 each have a drawback, with Gamma Cephei Ab being unconfirmed until 2002; while the PSR B1257+12 planets orbit a pulsar. This leaves 51 Pegasi b (discovered and confirmed 1995) as the first confirmed exoplanet around a non-compact star.

First	Planet	Star	Year	Notes
First detected exoplanet later confirmed	Gamma Cephei Ab	Gamma Cephei	1988 (suspected), 2002 (confirmed)	First evidence for exoplanet to receive later confirmation.
First exoplanets to be confirmed	PSR B1257+12 B PSR B1257+12 C	PSR B1257+12	1992	First super-Earths. These exoplanets orbit a pulsar.
First confirmed exoplanet around non-compact star	51 Pegasi b	51 Pegasi	1995	First convincing exoplanet discovered around a Sun-like star. While the minimum mass of HD 114762 b was high enough (11 Jupiter-masses) that it could be a brown dwarf, 51 Peg b's minimum mass meant that it almost certainly was near the mass of Jupiter.

== By discovery method ==
First discovery by a method
Discovery method	Planet	Star	Year	Notes
First planet discovered via pulsar timing	PSR B1257+12 B PSR B1257+12 C	PSR B1257+12	1992	First super-Earths.
First planet discovered via radial velocity	51 Pegasi b	51 Pegasi	1995	First convincing exoplanet discovered around a Sun-like star. While the minimum mass of HD 114762 b was high enough (11 Jupiter-masses) that it could be a brown dwarf, 51 Peg b's minimum mass meant that it almost certainly was near the mass of Jupiter.
First planet discovered via transit	OGLE-TR-56 b	OGLE-TR-56	2002	This was also the second planet detected through transiting, and the then farthest planet known at time of discovery. The first extrasolar planet detected to be transiting was HD 209458 b, which had already been discovered by the radial velocity method.
First planet discovered via gravitational lensing	OGLE-2003-BLG-235L b	OGLE-2003-BLG-235L / MOA-2003-BLG-53L	2004	This was discovered independently by the OGLE and MOA teams.
First planetary-mass companion discovered by direct imaging	2M1207 b	2M1207	2004/ 2005	May be a sub-brown dwarf instead of a planet, depending on formation mechanism and definitions chosen.
First directly imaged extrasolar planet discovered orbiting a star	DH Tauri b	DH Tauri	2005	Revised masses place it below the deuterium-burning limit. May be a brown dwarf companion. DH Tauri b and GQ Lupi b were confirmed as companions within about three month in 2005. Both could be brown dwarfs. If one is a planet, it is the first planet orbiting a 'normal' star, possibly the first exoplanet directly imaged.
First planet discovered through variable star timing	V391 Pegasi b	V391 Pegasi	2007	The planet was discovered by examining deviations from pulsation frequency from a subdwarf star. Now dubious.
First extrasolar planet discovered by indirect imaging (visible light)	Fomalhaut b	Fomalhaut	2008	Discovered by a light reflecting off of a dust cloud surrounding the planet. First planet orbiting an ABO star. In 2020 this object was determined to be an expanding debris cloud from a collision of asteroids rather than a planet.
First extrasolar planet discovered by astrometric observations	HD 176051 b	HD 176051 A or HD 176051 B	2010	Orbits around one of the stars in a binary star system although it is not known which component it is orbiting around.
First exoplanet discovered by orbital perturbations of another planet	Kepler-19c	Kepler-19 (KOI-84, TYC 3134-1549-1)	2011	Detected through transit-timing variation method. Its existence was inferred by the gravitational influence it had on the orbital periodicity of Kepler-19b.
First exoplanets discovered by orbital phase reflected light variations	Kepler-70b, Kepler-70c	Kepler-70	2011	Now dubious.
First exoplanet discovered by transit-duration variation method	Kepler-88c	Kepler-88 (KOI-142)	2013	Both transit timing variation and transit-duration variation was measured to measure deviations from the regular orbit of Kepler-88b. Deviations of the planet's transit duration and timing helped to discover Kepler-88c.
First exoplanet discovered by spectral template matching with moderate-resolution spectroscopy	Beta Pictoris d	Beta Pictoris	2026	This was simultaneously discovered by two independent teams, using spectral template matching and direct imaging.

== By detection method ==
Some of these planets had already been discovered by another method but were the first to be detected by the listed method.

First detection by a method
Detection method	Planet	Star	Year	Notes
First planet detected via radial velocity	Gamma Cephei Ab	Gamma Cephei	1988	First evidence for exoplanet to receive later confirmation.
First planet detected via pulsar timing	PSR B1257+12 B PSRB1257+12 C	PSR B1257+12	1992	
First planet detected by transit method	HD 209458 b	HD 209458	1999	This first exoplanet found to be transiting had already been discovered by the radial velocity method. This is also the first planet that has been detected through more than one method.
First planetary-mass companion directly imaged (infrared)	2M1207 b	2M1207	2004/ 2005	May be a sub-brown dwarf instead of a planet, depending on formation mechanism and definitions chosen. If it is a planet, it is the first known planet around a brown dwarf.
First directly imaged extrasolar planet orbiting a star (infrared)	DH Tauri b	DH Tauri	2005	Revised masses place it below the deuterium-burning limit. May be a brown dwarf companion. DH Tauri b and GQ Lupi b were confirmed as companions within about three month in 2005. Both could be brown dwarfs. If one is a planet, it is the first planet orbiting a 'normal' star, possibly the first exoplanet directly imaged.
First planet with observed secondary eclipse (infrared)	HD 209458 b	HD 209458	2005	Planet was discovered in 1999. This is the first detection of light from an object with a clear planetary origin.
First directly imaged extrasolar planet orbiting a sun-like star (infrared)	AB Pictoris b	AB Pictoris	2005	It has 10±1 M_{J}. GQ Lupi b was found earlier. May, however, be a brown dwarf companion. 1RXS J160929.1−210524 b was found later. Revised mass places it at or above the deuterium-burning limit. May be a sub-brown dwarf instead of a planet, depending on formation mechanism and definitions chosen. The orbital status of the companion was confirmed in 2010.
First planet characterized by atmospheric spectroscopy	HD 209458 b	HD 209458	2007	also by HD 189733 b was characterized spectroscopically only few month later. Any of the earlier Direct imaging exoplanets, e.g. 2M1207 b, DH Tauri b or GQ Lupi b have spatially resolved spectroscopic observations, but the objects need confirmation to be of planetary origin.
First extrasolar planet detected by indirect imaging (visible light)	Fomalhaut b	Fomalhaut	2008	Discovered by a light reflecting off of a dust cloud surrounding the planet. First planet orbiting an ABO star. In 2020 this object was determined to be an expanding debris cloud from a collision of asteroids rather than a planet.
First planets directly characterized through astrometric observations	Gliese 876 b and Gliese 876 c	Gliese 876	2009	The planets in question had already been found with radial-velocity method.
First planet detected by orbital phase reflected light variations in visible light	CoRoT-1b	CoRoT-1	2009	The planet in question had already been discovered with transit method.
First planet characterized by spatially resolved atmospheric spectroscopy	HR 8799 c	HR 8799	2010	Several spectra of Direct imaging exoplanets might be earlier, but the objects need confirmation to be of planetary origin. Especially AB Pictoris b is a candidate, if its mass is confirmed to be 10±1 M_{J}.
First planets detected through ellipsoidal light variations of the host star	HAT-P-7b	HAT-P-7	2010	
First planets detected through transit timing variation method	Kepler-9b, Kepler-9c	Kepler-9	2010	Transit-timing variation was used to confirm both planets detected through transit method.
First planet detected through transit duration variation method	Kepler-16b	Kepler-16	2011	Orbital motion of the three-body system Kepler-16 causes variations of the duration of stellar eclipses and planetary transits.
First planet detected with eclipsing binary timing with well-characterized orbit	Kepler-16b	Kepler-16	2011	Kepler-16b itself was detected through transit method. There are stars with earlier detections through eclipsing binary timing. However, either those signals have matched with unstable orbits or the exact orbits are not known.
First planet detected by light variations due to relativistic beaming	TrES-2b	TrES-2A	2012	
First tilted multi-planetary system discovered	Kepler-56b, c and d	Kepler-56	2013	
First extrasolar planet detected through polarimetry	DH Tauri b / GSC 6214-210 b	DH Tauri / GSC 6214–210	2021	"polarization of several tenths of a percent for DH Tau B and GSC 6214-210 B in H-band" ... "unlikely to be caused by interstellar dust." ... "the polarization most likely originates from circumsubstellar disks." Both companions may be brown dwarfs or exoplanets. Polarized scattered light was found for HD 189733 b in 2008. It could not be confirmed and was disputed by two separate teams. Possibly a "Saharan dust event over the La Palma observatory in 2008 August". HD 189733 b was discovered in 2005.

== By system type ==
First discovery by system type
System type	Planet	Star	Year	Notes
First extrasolar planet discovered in a solitary star system	PSR B1257+12 B PSR B1257+12 C	PSR B1257+12	1992	First extrasolar planets discovered.
First multiple planet extrasolar system discovered	PSR B1257+12 A PSR B1257+12 B PSR B1257+12 C	PSR B1257+12	1992	First pulsar planetary system.
First planet discovered in a circumbinary orbit	PSR B1620-26 b	PSR B1620-26	1993	Orbits a pulsar and a white dwarf. Discovery confirmed in 2003.
First planet discovered in globular cluster	PSR B1620-26 b	PSR B1620-26	1993	Located in Messier 4.
First planet discovered in a multiple main-sequence star system	55 Cancri Ab	55 Cancri A	1996	55 Cnc has a distant red dwarf companion.: The planet around Gamma Cephei was already suspected in 1988, although its existence was not confirmed until 2002; Gamma Cephei Ab is the first relatively close binary with a planet.
First "free-floating" planet discovered (Note: Superjovian free-floating objects are not always considered planets due to the gray area between planets and brown dwarfs)	S Ori 68	—N/a	2000	~5 M_{Jupiter} Isolated status needs confirmation. Could be a companion of SE 70; needs confirmation. S Ori J053810.1-023626 (S Ori 70) has a mass of 3 M_{Jupiter}; needs confirmation.
First binary star system where both components have separate planetary systems	HD 20781 b HD 20781 c HD 20782 b	HD 20781; HD 20782	2011	
First multiple planet system in a multi-star system where multiple planets orbit multiple stars	Kepler-47b; Kepler-47c	Kepler-47	2012	NN Serpentis cataclysmic variable is suspected to have at least 2 planets as of 2009.

== By star type ==
First discovery by star type
Star type	Planet	Star	Year	Notes
First pulsar planet discovered	PSR B1257+12 B PSR B1257+12 C	PSR B1257+12	1992	
First known planet orbiting a white dwarf	PSR B1620-26 b	PSR B1620-26	1993	Orbits a pulsar and a white dwarf. Discovery confirmed in 2003. GD 66 b was announced in 2007, but has not been confirmed.
First known extrasolar planet orbiting a main sequence star (Sun-like)	51 Pegasi b	51 Pegasi	1995	First hot Jupiter.
First known planet orbiting a red dwarf	Gliese 876 b	Gliese 876	1998	
First "free-floating" planet discovered	S Ori 68	—N/a	2000	~5 M_{Jupiter} Isolated status needs confirmation. Could be a companion of SE 70; needs confirmation. S Ori J053810.1-023626 (S Ori 70) has a mass of 3 M_{Jupiter}; needs confirmation.
First known planet orbiting a true giant star	Iota Draconis b	Iota Draconis	2002	Planet Epsilon Reticuli Ab was discovered earlier in 2000, however its host star is a star of sub giant-giant type.
First known planet orbiting a brown dwarf	2M1207 b	2M1207	2004	May in fact be a sub-brown dwarf instead of a planet, depending on formation mechanism and definitions chosen. First directly imaged exoplanet.
First known planet orbiting a pre-main-sequence star	DH Tauri b	DH Tauri	2005	Revised masses place it below the deuterium-burning limit. May be a brown dwarf companion.
First known planet orbiting an A star (white star)	Fomalhaut b	Fomalhaut	2008	First extrasolar planet discovered by visible light image. In 2020 this object was determined to be an expanding debris cloud from a collision of asteroids rather than a planet.
First confirmed planet orbiting only a white dwarf	WD 0806−661 B	WD 0806−661	2011	Maybe a sub-brown dwarf instead of planet, depending on the formation mechanism.
First known planet orbiting a B star (blue-white star)	b Centauri b	b Centauri	2021	
First known planet orbiting a hypervelocity star	MOA-2011-BLG-262Lb	MOA-2011-BLG-262L	2024	

== By planet type ==
Firsts by planet type
Planet type	Planet	Star	Year	Notes
First super-Earth discovered (Note: The mass range of Super-Earths does not have a universally agreed upon value and depends on the definition used)	PSR B1257+12 B PSR B1257+12 C	PSR B1257+12	1992	First exoplanets discovered.
First hot Jupiter	51 Pegasi b	51 Pegasi	1995	First planet discovered orbiting a main sequence star other than the Sun.
First evaporating planet discovered	HD 209458 b	HD 209458	1999	First transiting exoplanet.
First free-floating planet discovered	OTS 44	—N/a	1998	
First super-Earth orbiting a main- sequence star	Gliese 876 d	Gliese 876	2005	Orbits a red dwarf star.
First icy extrasolar planet orbiting a main-sequence star	OGLE-2005-BLG-390Lb	OGLE-2005-BLG-390L	2006	Orbits a red dwarf star. The icy nature of this planet is not confirmed, as no radius measurements are available so the density is unknown.
First ocean planet candidate; also first small planet within the circumstellar habitable zone	Gliese 581d	Gliese 581	2007	Orbits a red dwarf star. This planet orbits a little too far from the star, but the greenhouse effect would be enough to make this planet habitable. The other ocean planet candidate, GJ 1214 b, was detected by transit in which the density was calculated and determined that this planet is an ocean planet. Now disputed.
First extrasolar terrestrial planet orbiting a main-sequence star	CoRoT-7b (planetary nature confirmed in 2009; terrestrial composition confirmed in 2022) / Kepler-10b (planetary nature and terrestrial composition confirmed in 2011)	CoRoT-7 / Kepler-10	2009 / 2011	Here "terrestrial" refers to a bulk density indicative of a rocky composition. Dulcinea (Mu Arae c) (discovered in 2004) has been proposed to be a terrestrial planet, but its terrestrial nature is not confirmed, as no radius measurements are available so the density is unknown. The minimum mass is comparable to that of Uranus, which is not a terrestrial planet. Janssen (55 Cancri e) has been proposed to be a terrestrial planet. However, its radius (1.9 times Earth's) is above the radius gap that distinguishes super-earths from sub-neptunes, and its bulk density is lower than that of the terrestrial planets. CoRoT-7b has been claimed to be the first "rocky" planet discovery. However, at the time of its discovery (2009), its composition was "loosely constrained without a precise mass". A 2010 study found that the mass and radius were consistent with an earth-like bulk composition but noted the large error bars due to stellar activity and remarked that additional RV data were necessary for "reducing the errors on the planet mass needed for comparing to planetary structure models". As of 2019, uncertainties in the bulk density of CoRoT-7b remain at the 50% level. A 2022 analysis employed noise mitigation techniques in an effort to resolve the planet masses that had "been under debate since their initial detection" in 2009. The 2022 study confirmed the rocky nature of CoRoT-7b. The first unequivocally confirmed terrestrial-like (rocky) planet is Kepler-10b (discovered and confirmed to have a rocky composition in 2011). The precision of the Kepler photometer combined with the quiet nature of the star and the detection of stellar oscillations enabling asteroseismology studies led to precise mass, radius, and bulk density measurements thereby confirming the rocky nature of the planet.
First Jupiter analogue	HIP 11915 b	HIP 11915	2015	The discovery raises the possibility that HIP 11915 will be the first Solar System analogue discovered.
First protoplanet	PDS 70 b	PDS 70	2018	

== Other ==
Other firsts
Record	Planet	Star	Year	Notes
First map of an extrasolar planet released	HD 189733 b	HD 189733	2007	The map in question is a thermal emission map.
First extrasolar planet with a deformation detected	WASP-103b	WASP-103	2022	The radial Love number was estimated for the planet from the transit light curve.
First multi-planet extrasolar system directly imaged	HR 8799 b HR 8799 c HR 8799 d HR 8799 e	HR 8799	2008	
First planet discovered with a retrograde orbit	WASP-17b	WASP-17	2009	The planet HAT-P-7b was discovered before WASP-17b, but its retrograde nature was announced after that of WASP-17b. The planet Nu Octantis Ab, whose orbit is retrograde in a close binary star, was suspected to exist since 2004 although it was not confirmed until 2025.
First planet discovered orbiting a Sun-like star in a star cluster	Pr0201b; Pr0211b	Pr0201; Pr0211	2012	Beehive Cluster star cluster.
First recorded planet-planet transit	Kepler-89d; Kepler-89e	Kepler-89	2012	Kepler-89e was found to partially transit Kepler-89d.
First extrasolar planet with serious potential to support life	Kepler-62f	Kepler-62	2013	Kepler-62f was the first definite near-Earth-sized planet discovered within its star's habitable zone.
First transiting planet discovered in a star cluster	Kepler-66b; Kepler-67b	Kepler-66; Kepler-67	2013	NGC 6811 star cluster; these two planets were, at the time of discovery, only two of six total planets known in star clusters.
First map of cloud coverage of an extrasolar planet	Kepler-7b	Kepler-7	2013	Observations indicate cloud coverage in the west and clear skies in the east.
First not tidally locked extrasolar planet to have its day length measured	Beta Pictoris b	Beta Pictoris	2014	Rotation time was calculated to be 8.1 hours.
First planet found to contain water in the stratosphere	WASP-121b	WASP-121	2017	
First extrasolar planet system with one radial velocity and one directly imaged planet	Beta Pictoris b Beta Pictoris c	Beta Pictoris	2019	
First Earth-mass rogue planet unbounded by any star, and free floating in the Milky Way galaxy.	OGLE-2016-BLG-1928	—N/a	2020	Detected by microlensing techniques.

== See also ==
- Lists of exoplanets
- List of exoplanet extremes
- Methods of detecting exoplanets
