= Pulsar planet =

Planets found orbiting pulsars

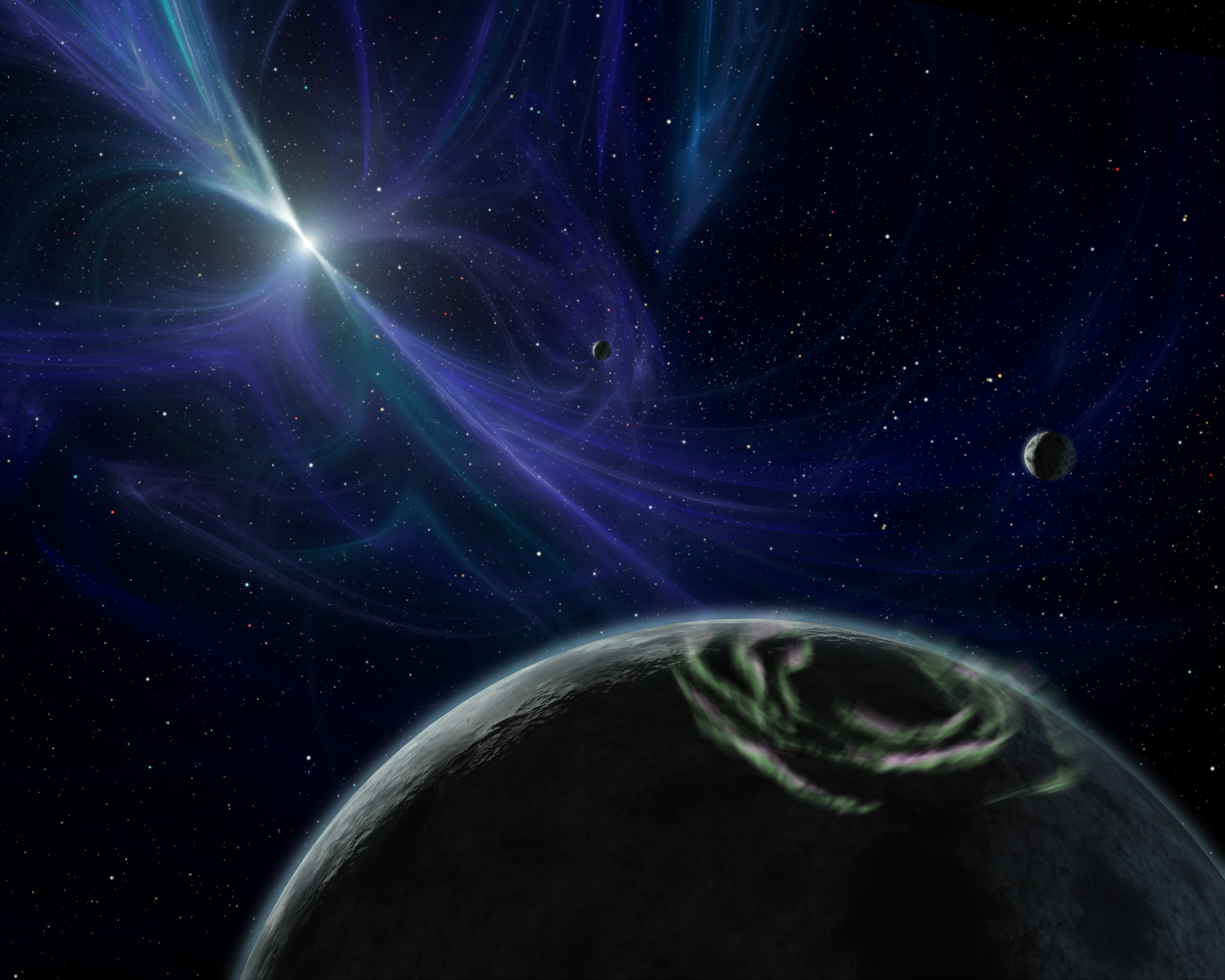
Artist's concept of a pulsar with planets

Pulsar planets are planets that are orbiting pulsars. The first such planets to be discovered were around a millisecond pulsar in 1992 and were the first extrasolar planets to be confirmed as discovered. Pulsars are extremely precise clocks, and even small planets can create detectable variations in pulsar traits. As of 2025, the least massive exoplanet observed by humans is a pulsar planet.

They are extremely rare, with only half a dozen listed by the NASA Exoplanet Archive. Only special processes can give rise to planet-sized companions around pulsars, and many are thought to be exotic bodies, such as planets made of diamond, that were formed through the partial destruction of a companion star. Pulsars' intense radiation and winds — consisting of electron-positron pairs — would tend to strip atmospheres away from such planets, exposing the surface to the stellar elements, and making them extraordinarily unlikely abodes for life.

== Formation ==
The formation of planets requires the existence of a protoplanetary disk, and most theories also require a "dead zone" within it where there is no turbulence. There, planetesimals can form and accumulate without falling into the star. Compared to young stars, pulsars have a much higher luminosity and thus the formation of a dead zone is hindered by the ionization of the disk by the pulsar's radiation, which allows the magnetorotational instability to trigger turbulence and thus destroy the dead zone. Thus, a disk needs to have a large mass if it is to give rise to planets.

There are several processes (Note: Pre-existent planets surviving the supernova are known as a "Salamander" scenario; in mythology salamanders are thought to survive fires. Planets formed from stellar debris are known as "Memnonides" scenarios; Memnonides, according to the Roman poet Ovid, were birds formed from the ashes of the warrior Memnon.) that could give rise to planetary systems:

- "First-generation" planets are planets that orbited the star before it went supernova and became a pulsar: Massive stars tend to lack planets, or at least appear to — possibly due to the difficulty in detecting them around very bright stars — but also because the radiation from such stars would destroy the protoplanetary disks. Planets orbiting within about four astronomical units of the star risk being engulfed and destroyed when it becomes a red giant or red supergiant. During the supernova, the system loses about half of its mass, and unless the pulsar is ejected in the same direction as the planet was moving at the time of the supernova, the planets are likely to detach from the system. None of the known pulsar planet systems are likely to have formed in this process.
- "Second-generation" planets from material that falls back on the pulsar after a supernova: The material could theoretically reach a mass comparable to that of a protoplanetary disk, but is likely to dissipate too fast to allow the formation of planets. There are no known examples of planets around young pulsars.
- "Third-generation" planets: A companion star is destroyed through the interaction with a pulsar, forming a low-mass disk. Pulsars can emit energetic radiation that heats the companion star, until it overflows its Roche lobe and is eventually destroyed. Another mechanism is the emission of gravitational waves, which shrink the orbit until the companion star (in these cases often a white dwarf) breaks up. In a third mechanism, the pulsar penetrates the envelope of a larger star, causing it to break up and form a disk around the pulsar. Disks formed in these processes are much more massive than these formed through fallback and thus persist for longer times, allowing the formation of planets. They also contain heavy elements that are essential building blocks for planets, and part of the disk will be accreted by the pulsar and spins it up in the process. Alternatively, a light white dwarf is destroyed by the interaction with a more massive one; the light white dwarf gives rise to a debris disk that generates a planet while the larger white dwarf becomes a pulsar.
- A companion star may be destroyed during the interaction with a pulsar but leave a planet-sized remnant, such a system is known as a "black widow" but is not always considered a form of pulsar planet.
- Finally, it is possible that planets from companion stars or rogue planets are captured by a pulsar, or that a pulsar merged with the original host star of the planets. The latter process would form a "common envelope" which eventually breaks down to form a disk from which planets can develop.

=== Implications ===
The formation scenarios have consequences for the planets' composition: A planet formed from supernova debris is likely rich in metals and radioactive isotopes and may contain large quantities of water; one formed through the break-up of a white dwarf would be carbon rich and consist of large amounts of diamond; an actual white dwarf fragment would be extremely dense. As of 2022, the most common type of planet around a pulsar is a "diamond planet", a very low-mass white dwarf. Other objects around pulsars could include asteroids, comets and planetoids. More speculative scenarios are planets consisting of strange matter, which could occur much more close to the pulsars than ordinary matter planets, potentially emitting gravitational waves.

Planets can interact with the magnetic field of a pulsar to produce so-called "Alfvén wings," these are wing-shaped electrical currents around the planet which inject energy into the planet and could produce detectable radio emissions.

== Observability ==
Pulsars are extremely precise clocks and pulsar timing is highly regular. It is thus possible to detect very small objects around pulsars, down to the size of large asteroids, from changes in the timing of the pulsar hosting them. The timing needs to be corrected for the effects of the motions of Earth and the Solar System, errors in the position estimates of the pulsar and of the travel times of the radiation across the interstellar medium. Pulsars spin and slow down over time in highly regular fashion; planets alter this pattern through their gravitational attraction on the pulsar, causing a Doppler shift in the pulses. The technique could in theory be also used to detect exomoons around pulsar planets. There are limitations to pulsar planet visibility, however; pulsar glitches and changes in the pulsation mode can mimick the existence of planets.

The first (Note: The earlier detection of the planets HD 114762 b and Gamma Cephei Ab was considered uncertain at the time and so they are not considered the first discovered exoplanets; additionally HD 114762 b was later discovered to be a star (red dwarf rather than a planet.)) extrasolar planets to be discovered (in 1992 by Dale Frail and Aleksander Wolszczan) were the pulsar planets around PSR B1257+12. The discovery demonstrated that exoplanets can be detected from Earth, and led to the expectation that extrasolar planets might not be uncommon. As of 2016 the least massive known extrasolar planet (PSR B1257+12 A, only 0.02 M_{🜨}) is a pulsar planet.

However, the size and particular spectroscopic traits makes actually visualizing such planets very difficult. One potential way to image a planet is to detect its transit in front of the star: in case of pulsar planets, the probability of a planet transiting in front of pulsar is very low because of the small size of pulsars. Spectroscopic analyses of planets are rendered difficult by the complicated spectra of pulsars. Interactions between a planetary magnetic field, the pulsar and the thermal emissions of planets are more likely avenues of getting information on the planets.

Pulsar planets have been invoked to explain certain astronomical phenomena, such as X-ray bursts from soft gamma repeaters.

== Occurrence ==
As of 2022 only about half-dozen (Note: The NASA Exoplanet Archive has seven planets listed for bodies with the name "PSR" as of 25 March 2023 while the Extrasolar Planets Encyclopedia has 24 planets listed for the same criteria.) pulsar planets are known, implying an occurrence rate of no more than one planetary system per 200 pulsars (Note: For comparison, it is believed that one fourth to one fifth of all known white dwarfs—the other kind of stellar corpse—bear planets.) although differences in the definition of "planet" mean that different surveys report different counts. This rarity is supported by the results of large-scale searches for pulsar planets. Most of the planet formation scenarios require that the precursor be a binary star with one star much more massive than the other, and that the system survives the supernova that generated the pulsar. Both these conditions are rarely met and thus the formation of pulsar planets is a rare process. Additionally, planets and their orbits would have to survive the energetic radiation emitted by pulsars, including X-rays, gamma rays and energetic particles ("pulsar wind"). This would be particularly important for millisecond pulsars that were spun up by accretion, while they formed X-ray binaries; the radiation emitted under these circumstances would evaporate any planet. Pulsars remain visible for only a few million years, less than the time it takes for a planet to form, thus limiting the chance of observing one.

Based on the known occurrence rate of pulsar planets, there might be as many as 10 million of them in the Milky Way. (Note: By comparison, the Milky Way has about 100–400 billion stars, most of which are thought to feature planets.) All known pulsar planets are found around millisecond pulsars, these are old pulsars that were spun up through the accretion of mass from a companion. As of 2015 there are no known planets around young pulsars; they are less regular than millisecond pulsars, increasing the pulsar timing error and thus making planet detection more difficult.

=== Confirmed pulsar planets ===
The parameters of known pulsar (Note: Planets are named in order of discovery, beginning with a lowercase "b" which comes after the star's name. In multiple star systems, the stars are given an uppercase letter after the system's name, but beginning with "A" for the main star.) (Note: Should be divided by ~318 to convert from Earth mass to Jupiter mass) planetary system
| Companion (in order from star) | Mass | Semimajor axis (AU) | Orbital period (days) | Eccentricity | Inclination (°) | Radius (Note: Radius calculated with median mass and minimum density in the equation d=(1.89813*10^(30)*m)/((4/3)*π*r^{3}), where d is density (in g/cm^{3}), m is the mass (in M_{J}) and r is the radius (in centimeters). Should be divided by 7.1492×10^{9} to convert from centimeters to R_{J}) |
|---|---|---|---|---|---|---|
| M62H b | >2.47 M_{J} | | 0.132935 | ~ | ~ | <0.653 R_{J} |
| PSR B1257+12 b | 0.02 M_{🜨} (6.3 × 10⁻⁵ M_{J}) | 0.19 | 25.262 | 0 | ~ | ~ |
| PSR B1257+12 c | 4.3 M_{🜨} (0.0135 M_{J}) | 0.36 | 66.5419 | 0.0186 | ~ | |
| PSR B1257+12 d | 3.9 M_{🜨} (0.0123 M_{J}) | 0.46 | 98.2114 | 0.03 | ~ | |
| PSR B1620−26 b | 2.5 M_{J} | 23 | 34,675 | ~ | ~ | 1.18 R_{J} |
| PSR J1719−1438 b | 1.2 M_{J} | 0.0044 | 0.090706293 | 0.06 | ~ | 0.4 R_{J} |
| PSR J2322−2650 b | 0.7949 M_{J} | 0.0102 | 0.322963997 | 0.0017 | ~ | 1.24 R_{J} |
| PSR J1748−2021H b | 7.54 M_{J} | 0.0111 | 0.360787526 | ~ | ~ | ~ |
| PSR J0636+5129 b | 8.5 M_{J} | 0.0036 | 0.0665513392 | ~ | 60 | 0.74 R_{J} |
| PSR J1807−2459 A b | 10.5 M_{J} | ~ | 0.07 | ~ | ~ | ~ |
| PSR B1802−07 b | 10 M_{J} | 0.008098 | 0.071092 | 0.0000003 | ~ | ~ |
| PSR J1211−0633 b | 10 M_{J} | 0.0116 | 0.38634962 | ~ | ~ | ~ |
| PSR J0312−0921 b | 10.47 M_{J} | 0.00465 | 0.0975 | ~ | ~ | ~ |
| PSR J1824−2452G b | 11 M_{J} | 0.004875 | 0.1046 | 0.0000003 | ~ | ~ |
| PSR J1928+1245 b | 11 M_{J} | 0.005825 | 0.1366347269 | ~ | ~ | ~ |
| PSR J1824−2452M b | 11 M_{J} | 0.00854 | 0.242519219 | ~ | ~ | ~ |
| PSR J1630+3550 b | 11.3 M_{J} | ~ | 0.315863166 | 0.00042 | ~ | ~ |
| PSR J2241−5236 b | 12 M_{J} | ~ | 0.1456722395 | ~ | ~ | ~ |
| PSR J1311−3430 b | 12 M_{J} | ~ | 0.065115 | ~ | ~ | ~ |

==== M62H ====
M62H is a millisecond pulsar located in the constellation Ophiuchus. It is located in the globular cluster Messier 62, at a distance of 5,600 parsecs (18,000 ly) from Earth. The pulsar was discovered in 2024 using the MeerKAT radio telescope. M62H has a rotational period of 3.70 milliseconds, meaning it completes 270 rotations per second (270 Hz). Its planetary companion has a minimum mass of 2.5 M_{J} and a median mass of 2.83 M_{J}, assuming a mass of 1.4 M_{☉} for the pulsar. Its minimum density is of 11 g/cm^{3}. Assuming the median mass, it implies a maximum radius of 48,850 kilometres (30,350 mi). The planet takes just 0.133 days (3.2 h) to complete an orbit, and is located at a distance equivalent to 0.49% of an astronomical unit from M62H.

==== PSR B1257+12 ====
The pulsar PSR B1257+12, 710+43
−38 parsecs away in the constellation Virgo, was confirmed to have planets in 1992 based on observations made with the Arecibo Observatory. The system consists of one tiny planet with a mass of 0.02±0.002 Earth masses and two Super-Earths with masses 4.3±0.2 and 3.9±0.2 times that of Earth, assuming that the pulsar has a mass of 1.4 solar masses. They most likely formed from a protoplanetary disk, probably generated from the partial destruction of a companion star. Computer simulations have shown that the system should be stable for at least one billion years and that exomoons could survive in the system. The system resembles the inner Solar System; the planets orbit the pulsar at distances comparable to that of Mercury to the Sun and may have comparable surface temperatures. Reports of additional bodies in this system might be due to solar disturbances.

==== PSR J1719−1438 ====
A cthonian planet with a mass comparable to Jupiter but less than 40% of its radius orbits the pulsar PSR J1719-1438. (Note: Sometimes also known as PSR J1719-14, per PSR J1719-14) This planet is probably the carbon-rich remnant of a companion star that was evaporated by the pulsar's radiation and has been described as a "diamond planet". (Note: Its density-mass-radius characteristics imply that it consists entirely of diamond.)

==== PSR B1620−26 ====
A circumbinary planet with a mass of 2.5±1 Jupiter masses orbits around PSR B1620-26, a binary star consisting of a pulsar and a white dwarf in the globular cluster M4. This planet may have been captured into the pulsar's orbit, a process which is particularly likely within the packed environment of a globular cluster, and may be about 12.6 billion years old, making it the oldest-known planet. (Note: An alternative interpretation is that the planet formed through a common envelope, which could make it as young as 500 million years.) Its existence may demonstrate that planets can form in metal-poor medium including the globular clusters.

==== PSR J2322−2650 ====
PSR J2322-2650 seems to have a roughly Jupiter-mass companion. The radiation from the pulsar could be heating it to about 2300 K; a light source observed close to the pulsar may be the planet. This pulsar is considerably less luminous than many, which may explain why the planet has survived to this day. Observations with JWST NIRSpec found a windy (westwards (Note: Opposite to the spin direction of the planet.)) atmosphere rich in molecular carbon (C3, C2), implying a very high ratio of carbon to oxygen and nitrogen. This planet probably consists mostly of helium and began as a white dwarf.

=== Debris disks and precursors ===
Timing variations of the pulsars PSR B1937+21 and PSR J0738-4042 may reflect the existence of an asteroid belt (Note: In the case of PSR B1937+21, the most massive object is thought to have a mass of less than 1/10,000 of Earth's.) around the pulsars, and collisions between asteroids or comets and pulsars have been proposed as an explanation for the phenomenon of fast radio bursts, (Note: A fast radio burst is a burst of radio waves, lasting for milliseconds and originating outside of the Milky Way. One theory about their cause is that planets orbiting within a pulsar's magnetic field create a disturbance that produces the bursts, but there are no known examples of this process.) the gamma ray burst GRB 101225A and other types of pulsar variability. There are no known debris disks around pulsars, although the magnetars 4U 0142+61 and 1E 2259+586 (Note: The source states that the name is 1E 2259+286 but the correct name is 1E 2259+586.) have been suggested to harbour them.

The white dwarf–pulsar binary PSR J0348+0432 may be a system that could develop pulsar planets in the future. The existence of a dust cloud at the pulsar Geminga that may be a precursor to planets has been proposed.

=== Candidates ===
There were earlier reports of pulsar planets which were either retracted or considered unconvincing, such as the 1991 "discovery" of a planet around PSR B1829−10 which turned out to be an artifact caused by the motion of the Earth. The existence of planets around the pulsar PSR B0329+54 has been debated since 1979 and is still unresolved as of 2017. PSR B1828−11 has been conclusively established to display magnetospheric activity that mimicks planets, without having any, and a planet candidate around the pulsar Geminga was later attributed to timing noise. A study strongly suggests that the sub-Earth planet PSR J0337+1715 (AB) b is merely an artifact of "red noise", which is a product of variability within the pulsar in the system and can be falsely reported as planetary candidates. A systematic search for planets in the archival data of 800 pulsars found a strong candidate super-Earth and a weaker planetary candidate around PSR J2007+3120.

The parameters of candidate/suspect pulsar planets (Note: Should be divided by ~318 to convert from Earth mass to Jupiter mass) planetary system
| Companion (in order from star) | Mass | Semimajor axis (AU) | Orbital period (days) | Eccentricity | Inclination (°) | Radius |
|---|---|---|---|---|---|---|
| PSR B0329+54 b | 1.97 M_{🜨} (0.0062 M_{J}) | 10.26 | 10,140 | 0.236 | ~ | 1.22 R_{🜨} |
| PSR B1828−11 a | 1.3 M_{🜨} (0.0041 M_{J}) | ~ | 231 | 0.14 | ~ | ~ |
| PSR B1828−11 b | 6.0 M_{🜨} (0.0189 M_{J}) | ~ | 498 | 0.23 | ~ | ~ |
| PSR J1555−2908 c | 0.04132 M_{🜨} (1.3 × 10⁻⁴ M_{J}) | ~ | 4,500 | 0.27 | ~ | ~ |
| PSR B0525+21 b | 0.2988 M_{🜨} (9.4 × 10⁻⁴ M_{J}) | 10.35 | 10,132 | 0.96 | ~ | ~ |
| PSR B1937+21 b | 0.3178 M_{🜨} (0.001 M_{J}) | 11 | 11,400 | 0.2 | ~ | ~ |
| PSR J2007+3120 b | 2.3 M_{🜨} (0.0072 M_{J}) | ~ | 723 | <0.38 | ~ | ~ |
| SGR 1806−20 b | 18.0844 M_{🜨} (0.0569 M_{J}) | 0.85 | 238 | 0.992 | ~ | ~ |
| PSR B1540−06 b | 1.1 M_{🜨} (0.0034 M_{J}) | ~ | 1,473 | 0.12 | ~ | ~ |
| PSR B1714−34 b | 6.3 M_{🜨} (0.0198 M_{J}) | ~ | 1,417 | 0.14 | ~ | ~ |
| PSR B1826−17 b | 2.6 M_{🜨} (0.0082 M_{J}) | ~ | 1,102 | 0.35 | ~ | ~ |
| PSR B0144+59 b | 0.06 M_{🜨} (1.9 × 10⁻⁴ M_{J}) | ~ | 319 | 0.45 | ~ | ~ |
| PSR B1727−33 b | 3.5 M_{🜨} (0.0110 M_{J}) | ~ | 350 | 0.26 | ~ | ~ |
| PSR B2053+36 b | 0.09 M_{🜨} (2.8 × 10⁻⁴ M_{J}) | ~ | 1,013 | 0.4 | ~ | ~ |
| PSR J1758−1931 b | 6.1 M_{🜨} (0.0192 M_{J}) | ~ | 719 | 0.43 | ~ | ~ |
| PSR J1843−0744 b | 1 M_{🜨} (0.0031 M_{J}) | ~ | 650 | 0.4 | ~ | ~ |
| PSR J1904+0800 b | 1 M_{🜨} (0.0031 M_{J}) | ~ | 946 | 0.18 | ~ | ~ |
| PSR J2216+5759 b | 3.5 M_{🜨} (0.011 M_{J}) | ~ | 117 | 0.41 | ~ | ~ |
| PSR J1947+1957 b | 3.7 M_{🜨} (0.0116 M_{J}) | ~ | 1,070 | 0.56 | ~ | ~ |
| PSR B1931+24 b | 56 M_{🜨} (0.176 M_{J}) | ~ | 5,180 | 0.25 | ~ | ~ |
| PSR B0823+26 b | 0.08 M_{🜨} (2.5 × 10⁻⁴ M_{J}) | ~ | 28 | 0.37 | ~ | ~ |
| SWIFT J1756.9−2508 b | 7.8 M_{J} | 0.0012346 | 0.0379907 | ~ | ~ | ~ |
| PSR B0943+10 b | 2.8 M_{J} | 1.8 | 730 | ~ | ~ | ~ |
| PSR B0943+10 c | 2.6 M_{J} | 2.9 | 1,460 | ~ | ~ | ~ |

== Habitability ==
Pulsars emit a very different radiation spectrum than regular stars, with very little optical or infrared radiation but large amounts of ionizing radiation and electron-positron pairs, which are generated by the pulsar's magnetic field as it spins. Additionally, remnant heat from before the pulsar's birth, heating of the pulsar's poles from its own radiation and from mass accretion processes drives the emission of thermal radiation and neutrinos. The electron-positron pairs and X-rays are absorbed by planetary atmospheres and heat them, driving intense atmospheric escape that can strip them away. The presence of a planetary magnetic field could mitigate the impact of the electron-positron pairs.

Habitability is conventionally defined by the equilibrium temperature of a planet, which is a function of the amount of incoming radiation; a planet is defined "habitable" if liquid water can exist on its surface although even planets with little external energy can harbour underground life. Pulsars do not emit large quantities of radiation given their small size, though the habitable zone can easily end up lying so close to the star that tidal effects destroy the planets. Additionally, it is often unclear how much radiation a given pulsar emits and how much of it can actually reach a hypothetical planet's surface. Of the known pulsar planets, only those of PSR B1257+12 are close to the habitable zone and as of 2015, no known pulsar planet is believed to be habitable. Additional heat sources may be radioactive isotopes such as potassium-40 formed during the supernova that gave rise to the pulsar and tidal heating for planets with close orbits. Radiation from outside sources such as companion stars would also add to the energy budget.

== See also ==
- Lists of planets
- List of stars with proplyds
- Andrew Lyne
- Blanet
