= List of exoplanets discovered before 2000 =

This is a list of exoplanets discovered before 2000.

For exoplanets detected only by radial velocity, the mass value is actually a lower limit. (See Minimum mass for more information.)

While the existence of a substellar companion to Gamma Cephei was suspected since 1988, the planet Gamma Cephei Ab was not confirmed until 2003, and that is listed as its discovery year in exoplanet databases. Thus, this planet is in the List of exoplanets discovered between 2000–2009.

Name	Mass (M_{J})	Radius (R_{J})	Period (days)	Semi-major axis (AU)	Temp. (K)	Discovery method	Disc. Year	Distance (light years)	Host star mass (M_{☉})	Host star temp. (K)	Remarks and refs
16 Cygni Bb	2.38±0.04		798.5±1	1.693		radial vel.	1996	68.91±0.02	1.010±0.024	5751±11	(Note: Plávalová et al (2013) and Van Zandt et al (2026))
23 Librae b	1.8+1.2 −0.2		258.25±0.025	0.82±0.01		radial vel.	1999	85.39±0.08	1.12+0.01 −0.02	5762±9	(Note: Van Zandt et al (2026) and Li et al (2025))
47 Ursae Majoris b	≥2.395±0.079		1,075.61+0.79 −0.67	2.06+0.032 −0.033	200	radial vel.	1996	45.30±0.06	1.02±0.06	5,880±10	(Note: Li et al (2025))Proper name Taphao Thong
51 Pegasi b	0.46±0.02	1.2±0.1	4.230785±0.000036	0.0527±0.0030	1,250	radial vel.	1995	50.64±0.04	1.09±0.02	5,768±8	(Note: Brogi et al (2013),Spring et al (2023)and Butler et al (2006))Proper name Dimidium. First exoplanet discovered orbiting a main sequence star.
55 Cancri b	≥0.868±0.028		14.651552±0.000036	0.118±0.002	700	radial vel.	1996	41.05±0.02	0.905±0.015	5,172±18	(Note: Moutou et al (2025)and Salz et al (2015))Proper name Galileo
70 Virginis b	8.0+2.9 −0.7		116.69335+0.00093 −0.00097	0.478+0.004 −0.005		radial vel.	1996	59.03±0.08	1.09±0.02	5,473±32	(Note: Van Zandt et al (2026)and NASA Exoplanet Archive)
109 Piscium b	6.8+0.9 −0.3		1,075.50±0.69	2.14		radial vel.	1999	108.1	1.11	5600	(Note: Van Zandt et al (2026)and Xiao et al (2023))
Gliese 86 b	4.42		15.76491	0.11		radial vel.	1999	35.18	0.83	5182	
Gliese 876 b	2.2756		61.1166	0.208317		radial vel.	1998	15.25	0.32	3129	
HD 75289 b	0.456±0.010		3.50916±0.00002	0.047859±0.000002	1260	radial vel.	1999	94.66±0.05	1.141+0.020 −0.035	6184±43	
HD 89744 b	>8.35±0.18		256.78±0.02	0.917±0.009		radial vel.	1999	125.8±0.2	1.37±0.09	6381±43	
HD 130322 b	1.3+0.6 −0.1		10.70871±0.00018	0.093±0.001	720	radial vel.	1999	104.08±0.09	0.92±0.03	5387±44	Proper name Eiger
HD 168443 b	>8.09+0.24 −0.25		58.11164±0.00040	0.3006+0.0045 −0.0047		radial vel.	1998	127.4±0.2	0.995±0.019	5491±44	
HD 177830 b	1.69		410.1	1.14		radial vel.	1999	205.1	1.70	4901	
HD 187123 b	0.523		3.0965828	0.0426		radial vel.	1998	150.1	1.0	5830	
HD 192263 b	0.56		24.3556	0.15	486	radial vel.	1999	64.08	0.66	4976	Proper name Beirut
HD 195019 b	3.98		18.20132	0.14		radial vel.	1998	123	1.21	5751	
HD 209458 b	0.73	1.39	3.52474859	0.04707	1459	radial vel.	1999	157.8	1.23	6091	Informally named Osiris
HD 210277 b	1.29		442.19	1.13		radial vel.	1998	69.51	1.01	5538	
HD 217107 b	1.30		7.12682	0.08		radial vel.	1998	65.47	1.00	5622	
HD 222582 b	8.37	~1.12	572.38	1.34		radial vel.	1999	137.7	1.12	5790	
Iota Horologii b	2.27		302.8	0.92		radial vel.	1999	56.51	1.25	6167	
PSR B1257+12 b	0.000063		25.262±0.003	0.19	266	timing	1994	2300±100	1.4		Proper name Draugr. Least massive exoplanet known.
PSR B1257+12 c	0.014±0.001		66.5419±0.0001	0.36	193	timing	1992	2300±100	1.4		Proper name Poltergeist
PSR B1257+12 d	0.012±0.001	0.13	98.2114±0.0002	0.46	169	timing	1992	2300±100	1.4		Proper name Phobetor
PSR B1620-26 b	2.5	~1.18	36,525	23.0	72	timing	1993	12400	1.35		Informally named Methuselah
Rho Coronae Borealis b	1.045		39.8458	0.2196	614	radial vel.	1997	57.0	0.889	5627	
Tau Boötis b	4.5+0.8 −0.2	1.06	3.31	0.0481±0.028	1,600	radial vel.	1996	50.92±0.09	1.35±0.3	6387±0.44	
Upsilon Andromedae b	1.70+0.33 −0.24	~1.8	4.617111±0.000014	0.0594±0.0003	1,670-1,920	radial vel.	1996	40.0±0.1	1.23+0.03 −0.09	6,614±0.77	Proper name Saffar
Upsilon Andromedae c	13.98+2.3 −5.3		241.26±0.64	0.829±0.043		radial vel.	1999	40.0±0.1	1.23+0.03 −0.09	6,614±0.77	Proper name Samh
Upsilon Andromedae d	10.25+0.7 −3.3	1.02	1,276.46±0.57	2.350±0.014	218	radial vel.	1999	40.0±0.1	1.23+0.03 −0.09	6,614±0.77	Proper name Majriti

== Bodies previously considered as candidates ==
HD 114762 b was once considered as the first discovered exoplanet. Found in 1989 by a team led by David Latham, it is now known to be a red dwarf star. In 1991 it was reported an exoplanet 10 times the mass of Earth was discovered around the pulsar, PSR B1829-10. It was subsequently retracted later in 1992.

== Specific exoplanet lists ==
Lists of exoplanets

- List of directly imaged exoplanets
- List of exoplanet extremes
- List of exoplanet firsts
- List of exoplanets discovered by the Kepler space telescope
- List of exoplanets observed during Kepler's K2 mission
- List of exoplanets discovered by the TESS mission
- List of terrestrial exoplanet candidates for atmosphere detection
- List of hottest exoplanets
- List of coldest exoplanets
- List of multiplanetary systems
- List of circumbinary planets
- List of nearest exoplanets
- List of nearest terrestrial exoplanet candidates
- List of potentially habitable exoplanets
- List of proper names of exoplanets
- List of largest exoplanets
- List of smallest exoplanets
- List of transiting exoplanets
- List of exoplanets and planetary debris around giant stars
- List of exoplanets and planetary debris around white dwarfs
- List of extrasolar planetary collisions

=== Lists of exoplanets by year of discovery ===
- List of exoplanets discovered before 2000 (31)
- List of exoplanets discovered between 2000–2009 (376)
- List of exoplanets discovered in 2010 (109)
- List of exoplanets discovered in 2011 (178)
- List of exoplanets discovered in 2012 (147)
- List of exoplanets discovered in 2013 (149)
- List of exoplanets discovered in 2014 (869)
- List of exoplanets discovered in 2015 (144)
- List of exoplanets discovered in 2016 (1497)
- List of exoplanets discovered in 2017 (152)
- List of exoplanets discovered in 2018 (300)
- List of exoplanets discovered in 2019 (169)
- List of exoplanets discovered in 2020 (256)
- List of exoplanets discovered in 2021 (253)
- List of exoplanets discovered in 2022 (312)
- List of exoplanets discovered in 2023 (304)
- List of exoplanets discovered in 2024 (284)
- List of exoplanets discovered in 2025 (239)
- List of exoplanets discovered in 2026 (355)
