= List of coldest exoplanets =

This is a list of the coldest exoplanets known, specifically those with temperatures lower than −75 °C (198 K). Planets from the Solar System were also included for comparison purposes.

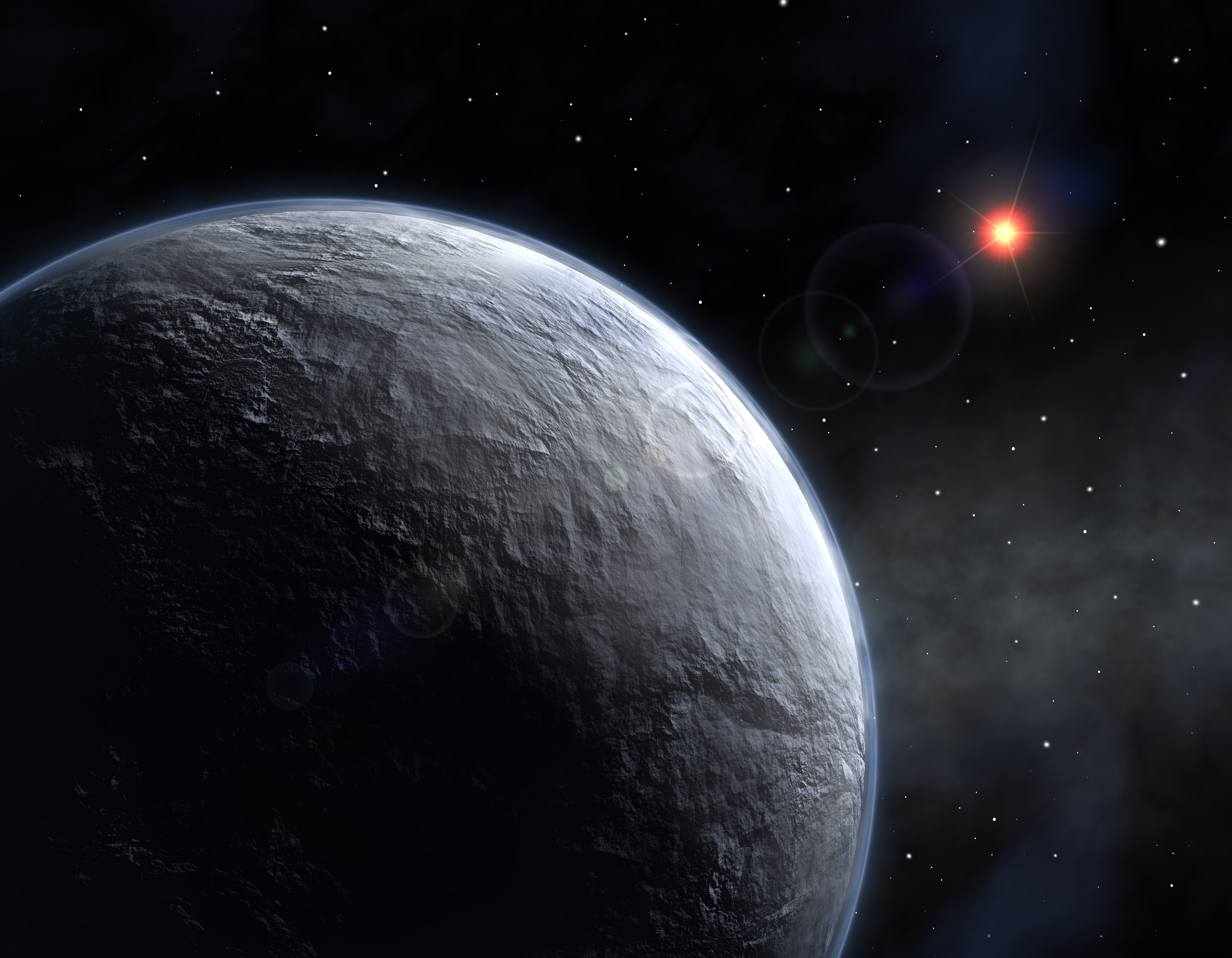
Discovered in 2006, OGLE-2005-BLG-390Lb is the coldest known exoplanet, and was nicknamed "Hoth" by NASA in reference to the planet from the Star Wars franchise.

Image (or artistic representation)	Name	Average 1 Bar Temperature (°C)	Mass (M_{⊕} or M_{J})	Method (Note: T_{eff}: Measured effective temperature. T_{eq}: The temperature of the planet has not been measured, so it is listed with the calculated equilibrium temperature.)	Notes	References
	OGLE-2005-BLG-390Lb	−223 (50 K)	5.5 M_{🜨}	T_{eq}	The coldest known exoplanet, with a temperature lower than the melting points of oxygen and nitrogen. (Note: The melting points of elemental Nitrogen and Oxygen at 1 bar pressure are -210 °C and -218 °C, respectively.)	
	OGLE-2005-BLG-071L b	−218	3.8 M_{J}	T_{eq}		
	PSR B1620-26 b	−201.2	2.5 M_{J}	T_{eq}	One of the oldest exoplanets known, with an age of about 12.7 billion years. (Note: The age is the same as the globular cluster where PSR B1620-26b is located (Messier 4), as all the stars in the cluster formed at the same time, and the planets form together with their host stars.)	
	Neptune (For reference)	−201	17.15 M_{🜨}			
	Uranus (For reference)	−197	14.54 M_{🜨}			
	TOI-969 c	−176.6+6.8 −5.8		T_{eq}		
	MOA-2007-BLG-400Lb	−173 or −239	0.5–1.3 M_{J}	T_{eq}		
	WASP-132d	−166+11 −18	5.16±0.52 M_{J}	T_{eq}		
	HD 154345 b	−162±2	1.186+0.095 −0.059 M_{J}	T_{eff}		
	HIP 11915 b	−155	0.99 M_{J}	T_{eq}	A Jupiter analog.	(Note: This was obtained using the CalcTool luminosity converter. Using the apparent magnitude of HIP 11915 and its distance from Earth (using the uncertainty parameter of ±10 light years), this yields a range of 1.03–1.27 L_{☉}. When used in the default 190 light-year distance (with margin of error) is 1.07+0.11 −0.09 L_{☉}. When run into simulations using the orbital distance of HIP 11915 and its planet, yields a result of 118 K.)
	Gliese 777 b	−152±4	1.68+0.26 −0.16 M_{J}	T_{eff}		
	Gliese 414 Ac	−148.3±13.5	53.83 M_{🜨}	T_{eq}		
	HD 191939 f	< −148	2.1 M_{J}	T_{eq}		
	Saturn (For reference)	−139	95 M_{🜨}			
	Kepler-167 e	−138.6±5	1.01 M_{J}	T_{eq}		
	HD 115954 b	−128.1+8.1 −13	8.29 M_{J}	T_{eq}		
	HD 118203 c	−127±3	11.1+1.3 −1.0 M_{J}	T_{eq}		
	GJ 1289 b	−123	>6.27±1.25 M_{🜨}	T_{eq}		
	Epsilon Eridani b (AEgir)	−123	0.63 M_{J}	T_{eq}		
	HD 164922 b	−114	0.365 M_{J}	T_{eq}		
	Teegarden's Star d	−114	>0.82 M_{🜨}	T_{eq}	One of the nearest exoplanets.	
	Jupiter (For reference)	−108	317.8 M_{🜨} (1 M_{J})			
	PSR B1257+12 d (Phobetor)	−104	3.9 M_{🜨}	T_{eq}	One of the first exoplanets discovered.	
	HR 5183 b	−102+5.2 −5.1	3.23 M_{J}	T_{eq}	A highly-eccentric orbit planet.	
	TRAPPIST-1h	−101.5	0.326 M_{🜨}	T_{eq}		
	TOI-4010 e	−99+8 −6	2.18 M_{J}	T_{eq}		
	HATS-59 c	−97.1±6.4	12.7 M_{J}	T_{eq}		
	HD 86226 b	−97±4	0.45 M_{J}	T_{eq}		
	GJ 1002 c	−91.3±5.2 (Note: This is the surface temperature if GJ 1002 c has no atmosphere.)	1.36 M_{🜨}	T_{eq}	Orbits within its star's habitable zone.	
	EPIC 248847494 b	−90+25 −18	<13 M_{J}	T_{eq}		
	Kepler-421b	−88.2+8.6 −4.8		T_{eq}	The transiting exoplanet with the longest orbital period around a single star. (704 days)	
	HD 192310 c	−88	24 M_{🜨}	T_{eq}		
	WD 1856+534 b	−87+6 −7	<5.2+0.7 −0.8 M_{J}	T_{eff}	Coldest exoplanet with a measured temperature.	
	Kepler-16b	−85	0.333 M_{J}	T_{eq}	A circumbinary planet.	
	Kepler-186f	−85 (Note: This is the surface temperature if Kepler-186f has no atmosphere.)	1.44 M_{🜨}	T_{eq}	Potentially habitable	
	TOI-4600 c	−82±6	<9.27 M_{J}	T_{eq}		
	PSR B1257+12 c (Poltergeist)	−80	4.3 M_{🜨}	T_{eq}	One of the first exoplanets discovered.	
	Gliese 876 b	−79	2.66 M_{J}	T_{eq}		
	TRAPPIST-1g	−75.8 (Note: This is the surface temperature if TRAPPIST-1g has no atmosphere.)	1.321 M_{🜨}	T_{eq}	Potentially habitable	
	HD 217107 c	−75±3	4.37+0.13 −0.10 M_{J}	T_{eff}		

== Unconfirmed planets ==
These exoplanets have not been confirmed.

Image (Or artistic representation)	Name	Temperature	Mass (Note: M_{⊕}: Earth mass M_{J}: Jupiter mass)	Notes	References
	K01174.01	−248 (25 K)		Has a size of 0.267 R_{J}	
	Proxima Centauri c	−234.2 (38.8 K)	7 M_{🜨}		
