= PSR B1620−26 b =

Ancient circumbinary jovian exoplanet orbiting PSR B1620-26 binary system

PSR B1620-26 b
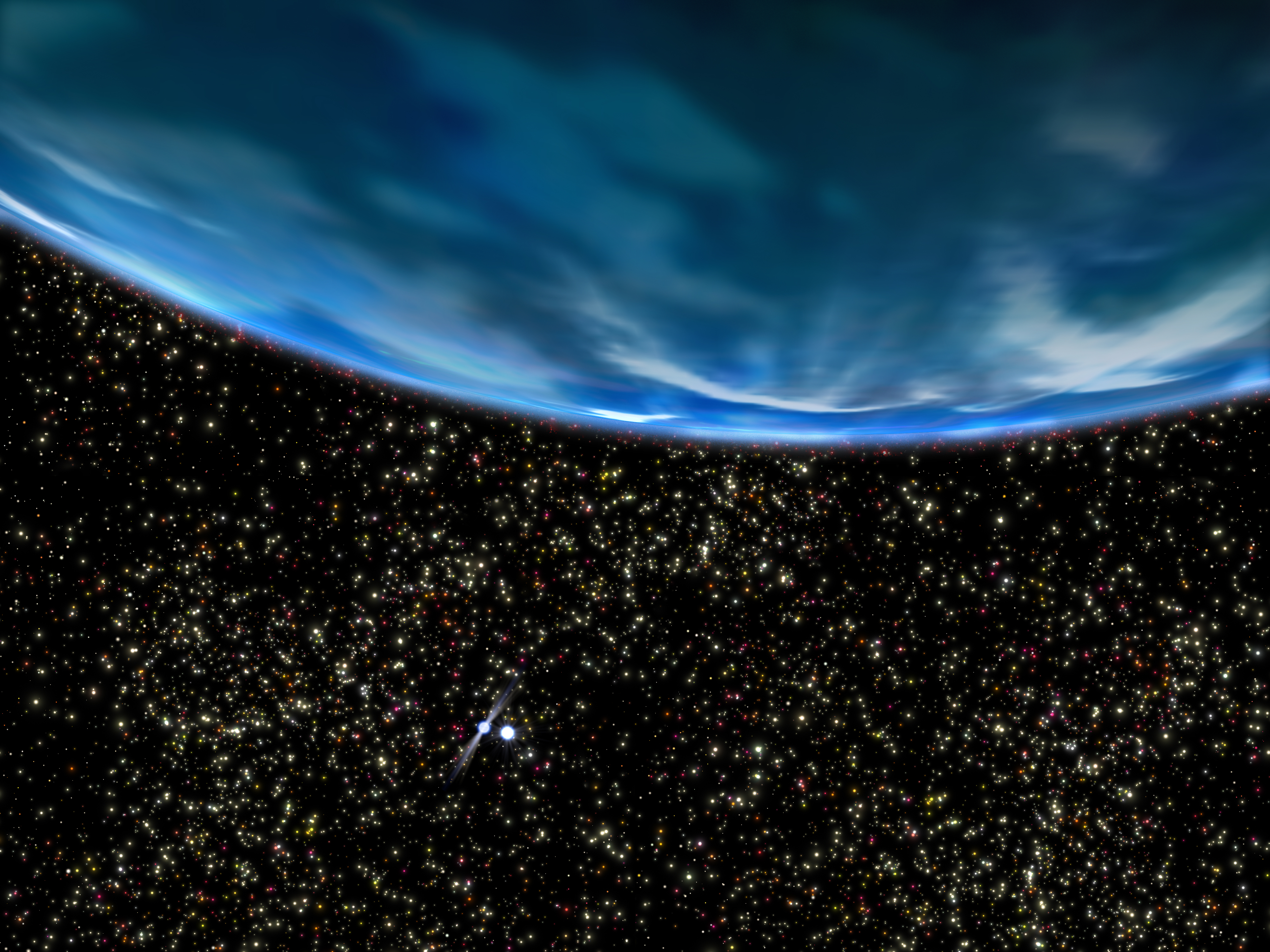
- An artist's impression of PSR B1620-26 b. Its parent stars (a white dwarf and a rapidly spinning pulsar) are visible in the background.

Discovery
- Discovered by: Backer et al.
- Discovery site: United States
- Discovery date: May 30, 1993 (confirmed July 10, 2003)
- Detection method: Pulsar timing

Orbital characteristics
- Semi-major axis: 23 AU (3.4×10^{9} km)
- Orbital period (sidereal): 36,525 d ~100 y
- Inclination: 55°
- Star: PSR B1620-26 AB

Physical characteristics
- Mean radius: 1.18 R_{J} (estimated)
- Mass: 2.5 (± 1) M_{J}

PSR B1620-26 b is an exoplanet located approximately 12,400 light-years from Earth in the constellation of Scorpius. It bears the unofficial nicknames "Methuselah" and "the Genesis planet" (named after the Biblical character Methuselah, who, according to the Bible, lived to be the oldest person) due to its extreme age. The planet is in a circumbinary orbit around the two stars of PSR B1620-26 (which are a pulsar (PSR B1620-26 A) and a white dwarf (WD B1620-26)) and is the first circumbinary planet ever confirmed. It is also the first planet found in a globular cluster. The planet is one of the oldest known extrasolar planets, believed to be about 12.7 billion years old.

== Characteristics ==
=== Mass, orbit, and age ===
PSR B1620-26 b has a mass of 2.627 times that of Jupiter, and orbits at a distance of 23 AU (3.4 billion km), a little larger than the distance between Uranus and the Sun. Each orbit of the planet takes about 100 years.

The triple system is just outside the core of the globular cluster Messier 4. The age of the cluster has been estimated to be about 12.7 billion years, and because all stars in a cluster form at about the same time, and planets form together with their host stars, it is likely that PSR B1620-26 b is also about 12.7 billion years old. This is much older than most known planets discovered to date, and nearly three times as old as Earth.

=== Host stars ===
PSR B1620-26 b orbits a pair of stars. The primary star, PSR B1620-26, is a pulsar, a neutron star spinning at 100 revolutions per second, with a mass of 1.34 M_{☉}, a likely radius of around 20 kilometers (0.00003 R_{☉}) and a likely temperature less than or equal to 300,000 K. The second is a white dwarf with a mass of 0.34 M_{☉}, a likely radius of around 0.01 R_{☉}, and a likely temperature less than or equal to 25,200 K. These stars orbit each other at a distance of 1 AU about once every six months. The age of the system is 12.7 to 13 billion years old, making this one of the oldest binary stars known. In comparison, the Sun has an age of 4.6 billion years.

The binary system's apparent magnitude, or how bright it appears from Earth's perspective, is 24. It is far too dim to be seen with the naked eye.

=== Evolutionary history ===
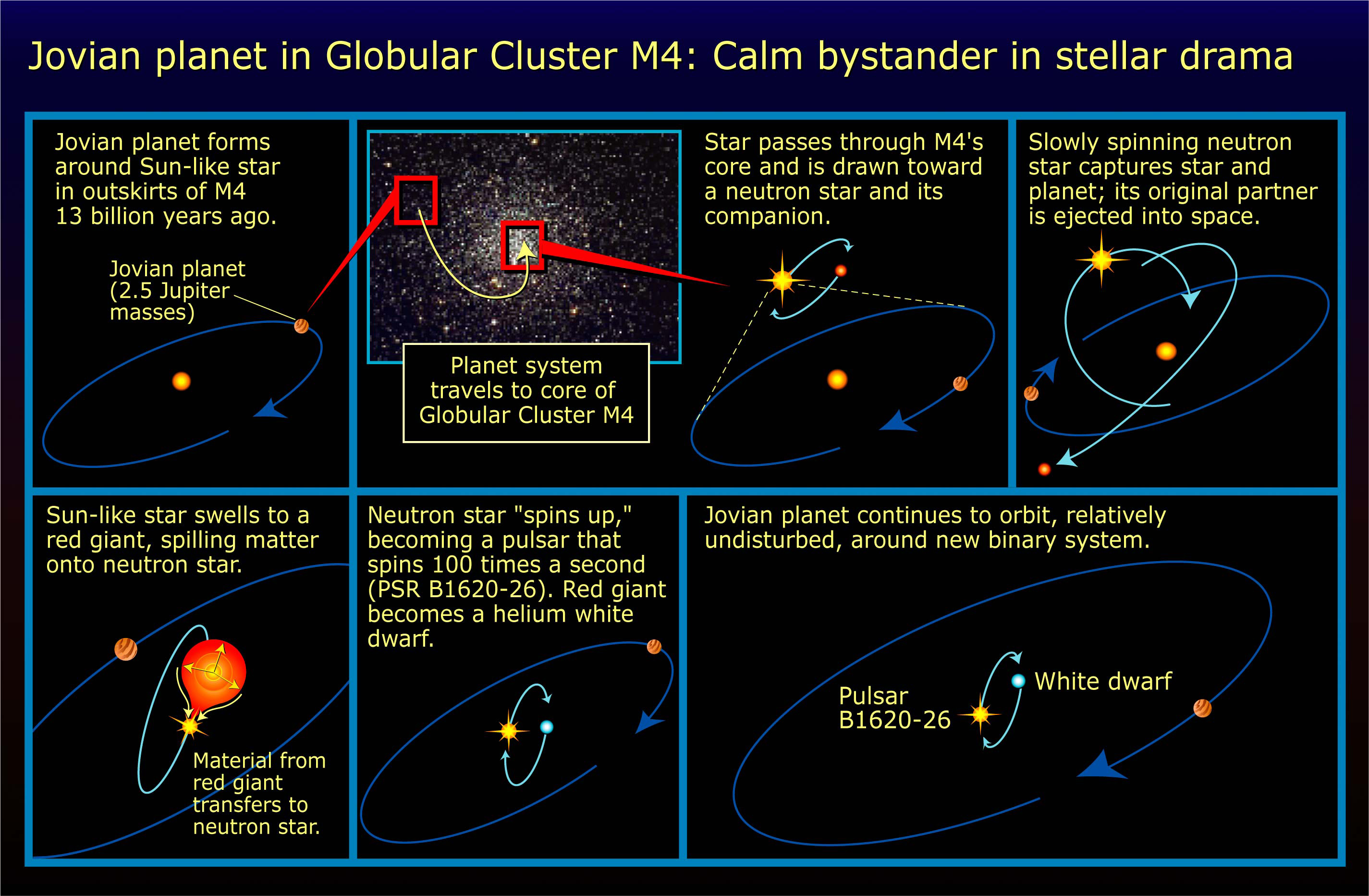
The evolution of the PSR B1620-26 system.

The origin of this pulsar planet is still uncertain, but it probably did not form where it is found today. Because of the decreased gravitational force when the core of star collapses to a neutron star and ejects most of its mass in a supernova explosion, it is unlikely that a planet could remain in orbit after such an event. It is more likely that the planet formed in orbit around the star that has now evolved into the white dwarf, and that the star and planet were only later captured into orbit around the neutron star.

Stellar encounters are not very common in the disk of the Milky Way, where the Sun is, but in the dense core of globular clusters, they occur frequently. At some point during the 10 billion years, the neutron star is thought to have encountered and captured the host star of the planet into a tight orbit, probably losing a previous companion star in the process. About half a billion years ago, the newly captured star began to expand into a red giant (see stellar evolution).

Typical pulsar periods for young pulsars are of the order of one second, and they increase with time; the very short periods exhibited by so-called millisecond pulsars are due to the transfer of material from a binary companion. The pulse period of PSR B1620-26 is a few milliseconds, providing strong evidence for matter transfer. It is believed that as the pulsar's red giant companion expanded, it filled and then exceeded its Roche lobe, so that its surface layers started being transferred onto the neutron star.

The infalling matter produced complex and spectacular effects. The infalling matter 'spun up' the neutron star, due to the transfer of angular momentum, and for a few hundred million years, the stars formed a low-mass X-ray binary, as the infalling matter was heated to temperatures high enough to glow in X-rays.

Mass transfer came to an end when the surface layers of the mass-losing star were depleted, and the core slowly shrunk to a white dwarf. Now the stars peacefully orbit around each other. The long-term prospects for PSR B1620-26 b are poor, though. The triple system, which is much more massive than a typical isolated star in M4, is slowly drifting down into the core of the cluster, where the density of stars is very high. In a billion years or so, the triple will probably have another close encounter with a nearby star. The most common outcome of such encounters is that the lightest companion is ejected from the multiple star system. If this happens, PSR B1620-26 b will most likely be ejected completely from M4, and will spend the rest of its existence wandering alone in interstellar space as an interstellar planet.

== Detection and discovery ==
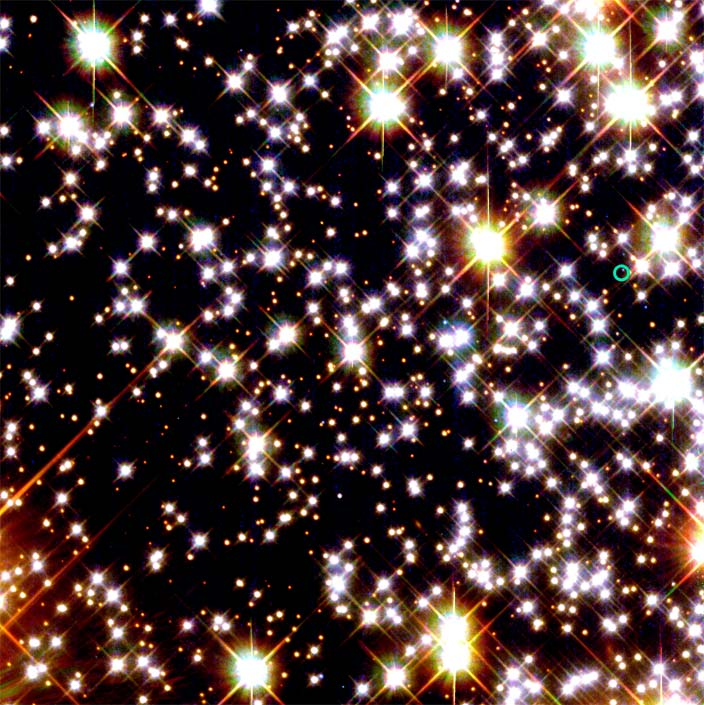
The location of the system (circled in green).

The system is located in the Messier 4 (M4) globular cluster.

Like nearly all extrasolar planets discovered prior to 2008, PSR B1620-26 b was originally detected through the Doppler shifts its orbit induces on radiation from the star it orbits (in this case, changes in the apparent pulsation period of the pulsar). In the early 1990s, a group of astronomers led by Donald Backer, who were studying what they thought was a binary pulsar, determined that a third object was needed to explain the observed Doppler shifts. Within a few years, the gravitational effects of the planet on the orbit of the pulsar and white dwarf had been measured, giving an estimate of the mass of the third object that was too small for it to be a star. The conclusion that the third object was a planet was announced by Stephen Thorsett and his collaborators in 1993.

The study of the planetary orbit allowed the mass of the white dwarf star to be estimated as well, and theories of the formation of the planet suggested that the white dwarf should be young and hot. On July 10, 2003, the detection of the white dwarf and confirmation of its predicted properties were announced by a team led by Steinn Sigurdsson, using observations from the Hubble Space Telescope. It was at a NASA press briefing that the name Methuselah was introduced, capturing press attention around the world.

== Name ==
While the designation PSR B1620-26 b is not used in any scientific papers, the planet is listed in the SIMBAD database as PSR B1620-26 b. Some popular sources use the designation PSR B1620-26 c to refer to the planet, as it was described as the third member of a triple system (composed of the planet and two stars). This designation does not appear in the SIMBAD database, and more modern naming conventions use a separated lettering system where lower-case letters to refer to planets and upper-case letters to designate stars (e.g. Gliese 667 Cc is the 'c' planet orbiting Gliese 667C, which is the 'C' star of a triple system), making PSR B1620-26 b the designation for a planet orbiting both stars of the PSR B1620-26 system. Neither usage is employed in the scientific literature with respect to the PSR B1620-26 planet.

Though not officially recognized, the name "Methuselah" is commonly used for the planet in popular articles. This name is usually used as the informal name to show the similarities to the planets of the Solar System, whereas the "letter name" is used astronomically. Methuselah is the only planet to have received a biblical name or nickname, although three other extrasolar planets have been given unofficial mythological nicknames (just like in the Solar System) – those planets being Dimidium, originally dubbed "Bellerophon"; Gliese 581 g, sometimes called "Zarmina", or even more rarely "Zarmina's World" or "Zarmina's Planet"; and HD 209458 b, occasionally referred to as "Osiris".

== See also ==
- 51 Pegasi b
- PSR 1257+12
- Pulsar planet
- List of exoplanets discovered before 2000
- List of exoplanet extremes
- List of exoplanet firsts
