= PSR B1620−26 =

Binary star system in the globular cluster of Messier 4

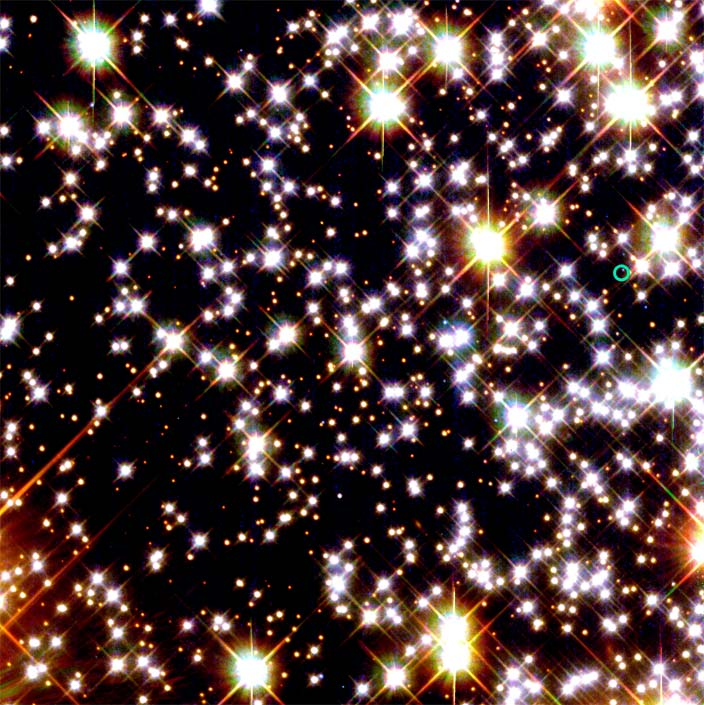
- The location of PSR B1620−26 (circled)

Observation data Epoch J2000.0 Equinox ICRS
- Constellation: Scorpius (M4)
- Right ascension: 16^{h} 23^{m} 38.2218^{s}
- Declination: −26° 31′ 53.769″
- Apparent magnitude (V): 21.30

Characteristics
- Spectral type: Pulsar + DB

Astrometry
Distance	12,400 ly (3,800 pc)

Details

PSR B1620-26
Mass	1.35 M_{☉}
Radius	0.00003 R_{☉}
Radius	20.85 km
Temperature	≤ 30,000 K
Rotation	11.0757509142025 ms
Age	12.2 Gyr

WD B1620-26
Mass	0.34 M_{☉}
Radius	0.01 R_{☉}
Radius	6,950 km
Temperature	≤ 25,200 K
Age	12.2 Gyr

Other designations
- PSR J1623−2631

Database references
SIMBAD	data

PSR B1620−26 is a binary star system located at a distance of 3,800 parsecs (12,400 light-years) in the globular cluster of Messier 4 (M4, NGC 6121) in the constellation of Scorpius. The system is composed of a pulsar (PSR B1620−26 A) and a white dwarf star (WD B1620−26, or PSR B1620−26 B). As of 2000, the system is also confirmed to have an exoplanet orbiting the two stars.

== History ==
The double system (triple including the substellar companion) is just outside the core of the globular cluster. The age of the cluster has been estimated to be about 12.2 billion years. Hence this is the age estimate for the birth of the planet, and two stars.

There is a minor dispute about the proper nomenclature rules to use for this unusual star system. One side regards the A/B convention of naming binary stars as having priority, so that the pulsar is PSR B1620−26 A, the white dwarf companion is PSR B1620−26 B and the planet is PSR B1620−26 c. The other side considers PSR to apply only to stars which are pulsars, not their companions, so the white dwarf should be named using the WD convention, making the pulsar PSR B1620−26, the white dwarf "WD J1623−266", and the planet "PSR B1620−26 b." Early articles used the first convention, but star catalogs have been using the second. The most recent proposal provides a nomenclature like PSR B1620−26 (AB)b, including capital letters A and B in parentheses to identify inner stellar components of binary system, followed by italic letter b referred to outer planetary companion. In practice, context makes it clear whether the pulsar, the white dwarf, the planet, or the system as a whole is being referred to.

== White dwarf ==
The mass of the white dwarf is 0.34 solar masses and orbits at a period of 191 days with an inclination of 55° relative to its pulsar companion. Its age is approximately (480±140)×10^{6} years.

== Planetary system ==
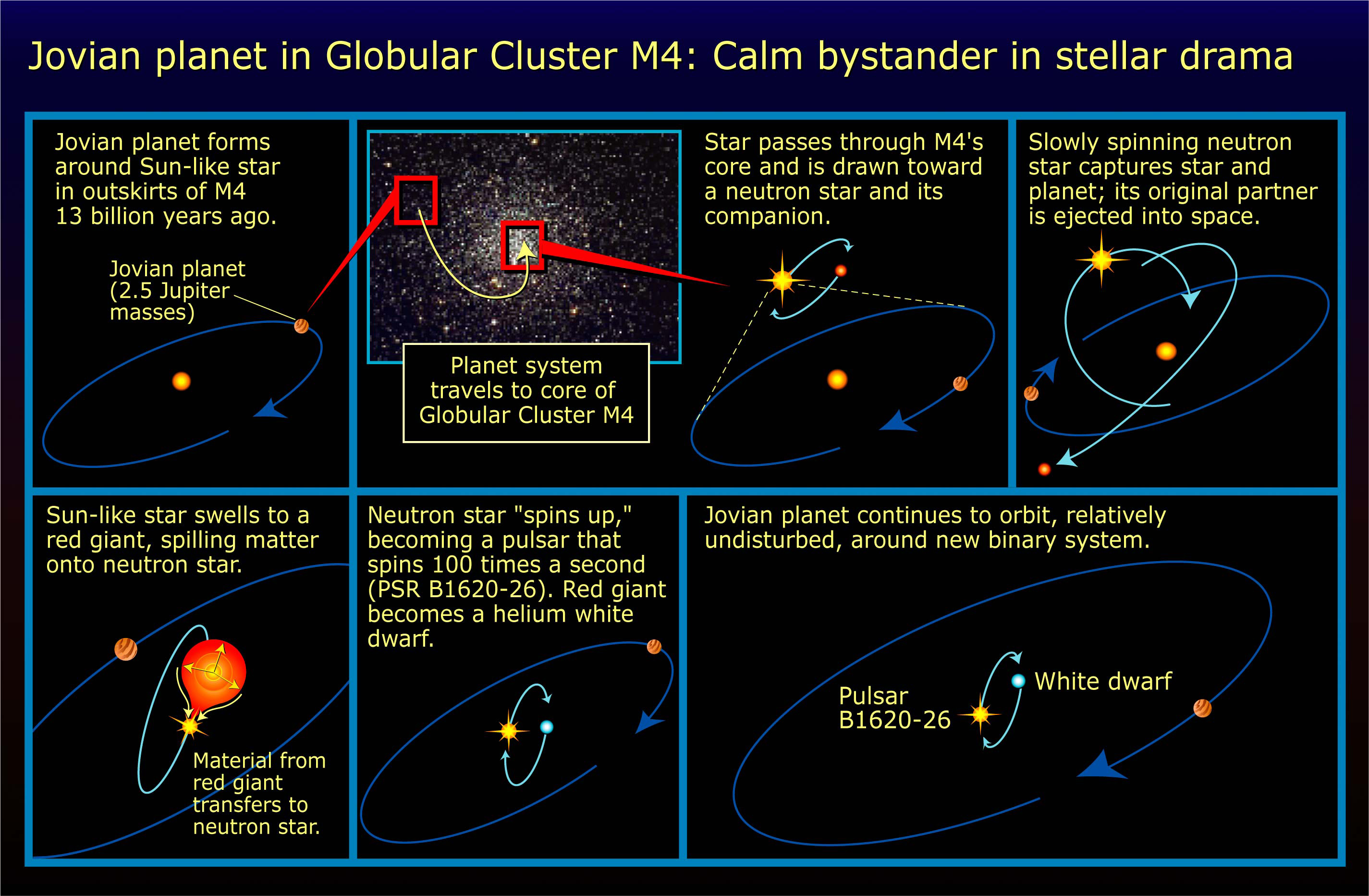
The evolution of the PSR B1620−26 system

PSR B1620−26 b was originally detected through the Doppler shifts its orbit induces on signals from the star it orbits (in this case, changes in the apparent pulsation period of the pulsar).

In the early 1990s, a group of astronomers led by Donald Backer, studying what they thought was a binary pulsar, determined that a third object was needed to explain the observed Doppler shifts. Within a few years, the gravitational effects of the planet on the orbit of the pulsar and white dwarf had been measured, giving an estimate of the mass of the third object that was too small for it to be a star. The conclusion that the third object was a planet was announced by Stephen Thorsett and his collaborators in 1993.

The PSR B1620−26 planetary system
Companion (in order from star)	Mass	Semimajor axis (AU)	Orbital period (days)	Eccentricity	Inclination (°)	Radius
b	2.5 ± 1 M_{J}	23	~36,500	low	55_{−8}^{+14}	—

== See also ==
- PSR B1257+12
- Delta Trianguli
- Pulsar planet
- List of exoplanets discovered before 2000 - PSR B1620-26 b
