= S Ori 70 =

Object in the Orionis cluster in the constellation Orion

S Ori J053810.1-023626
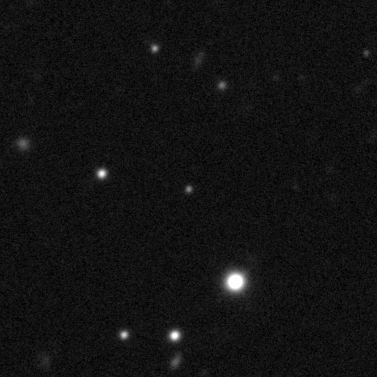
- S Ori 70 in the near-infrared Credit: ESO VLT HAWKI

Observation data Epoch J2000 Equinox ICRS
- Constellation: Orion
- Right ascension: 05^{h} 38^{m} 10.10^{s}
- Declination: −02° 36′ 00.0″

Characteristics
- Spectral type: T6
- Apparent magnitude (H): 20.07

Astrometry
Proper motion (μ)	RA: 10 mas/yr Dec.: 5 mas/yr
Distance	1,150 ly (352 pc)

Details
Mass	3 M_{Jup}
Surface gravity (log g)	3.5 cgs
Age	3 Myr

Other designations
- Mayrit 520267, S Ori 70, S Ori J053810.1-023626

Database references
SIMBAD	data

S Ori 70 or S Ori J053810.1-023626 is a mid-T type astronomical object in the foreground of the σ Orionis cluster, which is approximately 1,150 light-years from Earth. It was discovered on November 24, 2002 by M. R. Zapatero-Osorio and E. L. Martin's team at the Roque de los Muchachos Observatory. It has yet to be determined if it is a field brown dwarf or a 3-million-year-old rogue planet that is part of a cluster. Near-infrared spectroscopy images taken three years after its discovery led to the first motion measurements for the object. Its behavior is significantly different from what may be expected; it was further described as either a low-gravity atmosphere or an atmosphere with metallicity. The object's small proper motion suggests that it is further away than expected if it were a single field T dwarf.

== Discovery ==
The σ Orionis open cluster has been the focus of Osorio's team observations due to the age of the cluster (approximately 3 to 8 million years). The cluster also has low extinction, its distance is convenient, and it is observed to be rich and dense. Using the 4.2-meter (170-inch) William Herschel Telescope in a pencil-beam deep mini-survey measuring 55 square minutes of arc at a sensitivity of 21 magnitudes in the J and H Bands allowed the team to find S Ori 70. The raw data collected was reduced to the Image Reduction and Analysis Facility (IRAF), a standard technique used with near-infrared images; after subtracting the sky background and dark current, an extracted object spectrum was derived. It was the faintest and coolest member found in the cluster and was named S Ori 70.

=== Argument of the initial study ===
Adam J. Burgasser examined the claims of Osorio's T-type brown dwarf discovery and its spectroscopically verified low-mass. A comparison of the J band spectrum between S Ori 70 and other field objects was done. The J band spectrum revealed a distinct triangular-shaped spectral morphology which was previously explained by Zapatero-Osorio and Martín was due to the surface's low gravity. In order to see if similar discrepancies occurred in the T dwarf's behavior, Burgasser's team compared data from the claims of Osorio to that of standard COND models. Identical wavelength scales interpolated through both empirical and model spectra were Gaussian smoothed; this showed that best-fit spectral models can yield skewed gravities for late-type field T dwarfs which resulted in the underestimation of age and mass. Burgasser concluded that S Ori 70 is not a member of the Sigma Ori cluster but is rather a foreground field brown dwarf. Further study of the object suggest that the low gravity was not from the field T dwarf but rather a nearby background star. As of 2009 no direct scientific data have dispelled nor confirmed either conclusion.

It could be the first "free floating" non-stellar planet discovered with a mass of 3 M_{J}, but needs confirmation.

== See also ==
- List of exoplanet firsts
- S Ori 52
