= PSR B1257+12 A =

Sub Earth orbiting PSR B1257+12

PSR B1257+12 b / Draugr
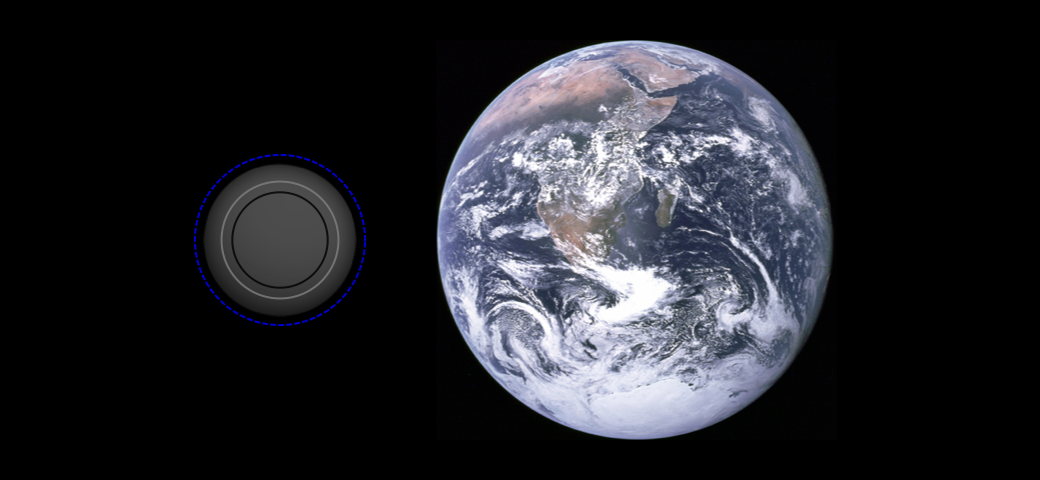
- Size comparison of Draugr with Earth (based on selected hypothetical modeled compositions)

Discovery
- Discovered by: Aleksander Wolszczan; Maciej Konacki
- Discovery site: United States
- Discovery date: 22 April 1994
- Detection method: Pulsar timing

Orbital characteristics
- Semi-major axis: 0.19 AU (28 million km)
- Eccentricity: 0.0
- Orbital period (sidereal): 25.262 ± 0.003 d
- Inclination: 50 (Note: The value of the inclination is assumed to be 50° based on the inclinations of the other two planets in the system, which have inclinations of 53° and 47°, respectively. The quoted mass value is based on this assumed inclination.)
- Time of periastron: 2,449,765.6 ± 0.2
- Star: Lich

Physical characteristics
- Mean radius: 0.338 R_{🜨}
- Mass: 0.020 ± 0.002 M_{🜨}
- Temperature: 266 K (−7 °C; 19 °F)

PSR B1257+12 b, alternatively designated PSR B1257+12 A, also named Draugr, is an extrasolar planet approximately 2,300 light-years (710 pc) away in the constellation of Virgo. The planet is the innermost object orbiting the pulsar Lich, making it a pulsar planet in the dead stellar system. It is about twice as massive as the Moon, and is listed as the least massive planet (with the mass accurately determined) known, including among the planets in the Solar System.

== Nomenclature ==
The convention that arose for designating pulsars was that of using the letters PSR (Pulsating Source of Radio) followed by the pulsar's right ascension and degrees of declination. The modern convention prefixes the older numbers with a B meaning the coordinates are for the 1950.0 epoch. All new pulsars have a J indicating 2000.0 coordinates and also have declination including minutes. Pulsars that were discovered before 1993 tend to retain their B names rather than use their J names, but all pulsars have a J name that provides more precise coordinates of its location in the sky.

On its discovery, the planet was designated PSR 1257+12 A and later PSR B1257+12 b. It was discovered before the convention that extrasolar planets receive designations consisting of the star's name followed by lower-case Roman letters starting from "b" was established. However, it is listed under the latter convention on astronomical databases such as SIMBAD and the Extrasolar Planets Encyclopedia. Hence the designation PSR B1257+12 b.

In July 2014, the International Astronomical Union launched NameExoWorlds, a process for giving proper names to certain exoplanets and their host stars. The process involved public nomination and voting for the new names. In December 2015, the IAU announced the winning name was 'Draugr' for this planet. The winning name was submitted by the Planetarium Südtirol Alto Adige in Karneid, Italy. Draugr are undead creatures in Norse mythology.

== See also ==
- List of exoplanets discovered before 2000 – PSR B1257+12 b

Preceded by PSR B1257+12 C	Least massive known exoplanet 1994–2013	Succeeded by Kepler-37b
