= GD 66 =

Star in the constellation Auriga

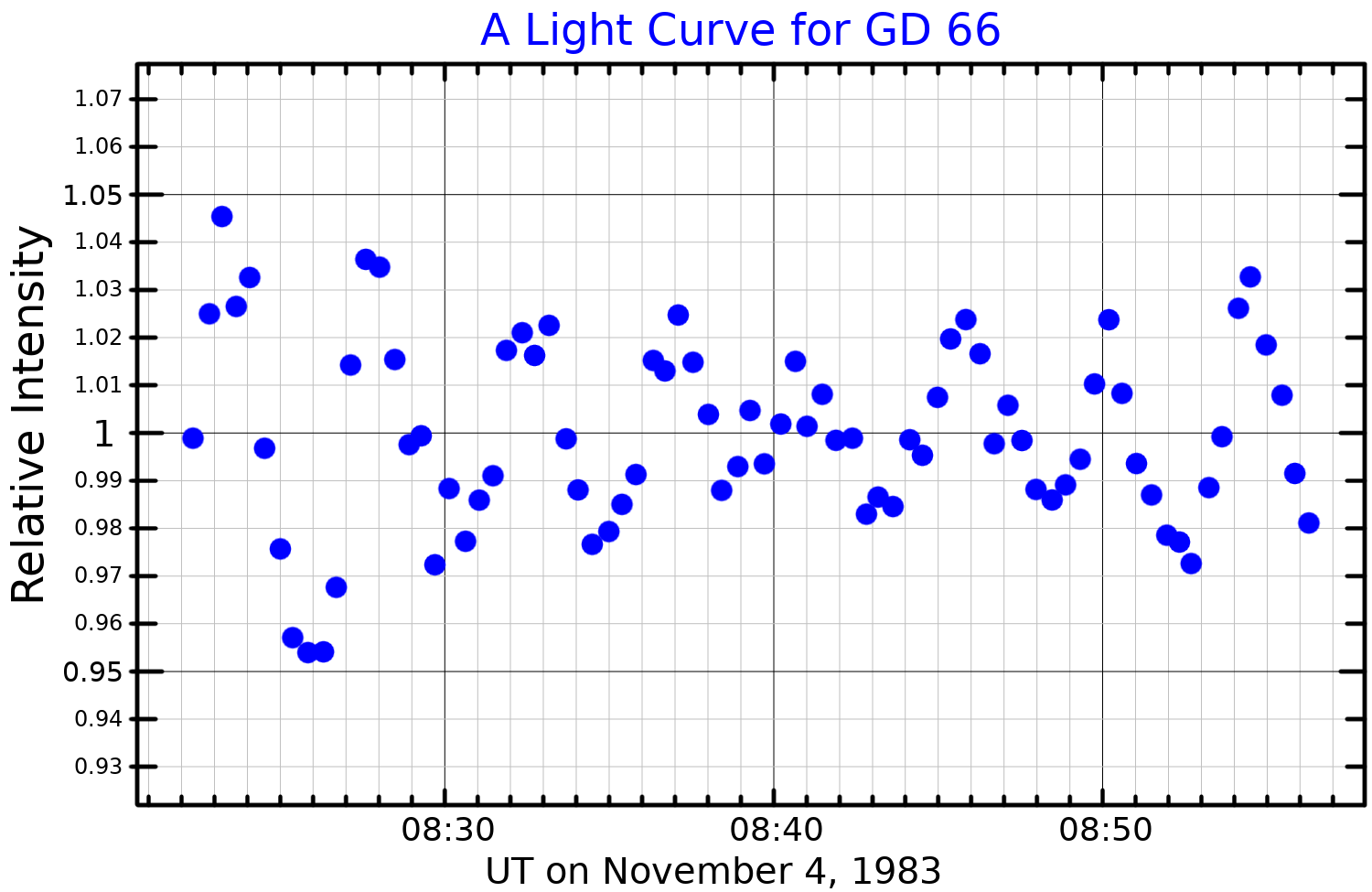
- A light curve for GD 66, adapted from Fontaine et al. (1985)

Observation data Epoch J2000 Equinox ICRS
- Constellation: Auriga
- Right ascension: 05^{h} 20^{m} 38.32^{s}
- Declination: +30° 48′ 23.9″
- Apparent magnitude (V): 15.6

Characteristics
- Evolutionary stage: white dwarf
- Spectral type: DA4.1
- U−B color index: −0.59
- B−V color index: +0.22
- Variable type: ZZA

Astrometry
Proper motion (μ)	RA: +57.213 mas/yr Dec.: −122.348 mas/yr
Parallax (π)	17.5116±0.0387 mas
Distance	186.3 ± 0.4 ly (57.1 ± 0.1 pc)
Absolute magnitude (M_{V})	11.79

Details
Mass	0.64±0.03 M_{☉}
Surface gravity (log g)	8.05 cgs
Temperature	11,980 K
Age	1.2–1.7 Gyr

Other designations
- GD 66, 361 Aurigae, EGGR 572, WD 0517+30, WD 0517+307, 2MASS J05203829+3048239

Database references
SIMBAD	data

GD 66 or V361 Aurigae is a 0.64 solar mass (M_{☉}) pulsating white dwarf star located 186 light years from Earth in the constellation Auriga. The estimated cooling age of the white dwarf is 500 million years. Models of the relationship between the initial mass of a star and its final mass as a white dwarf star suggest that when the star was on the main sequence it had a mass of approximately 2.5 M_{☉}, which implies its lifetime was around 830 million years. The total age of the star is thus estimated to be in the range 1.2 to 1.7 billion years.

In 1983, Noël Dolez et al. discovered that GD 66 is a variable star, from photometric data obtained at Haute-Provence Observatory. It was given its variable star designation, V361 Aurigae, in 1985. The star is a pulsating white dwarf of type DAV, with an extremely stable period. Small variations in the phase of pulsation led to the suggestion that the star was being orbited by a giant planet which caused the pulsations to be delayed due to the varying distance to the star caused by the reflex motion about the system's centre-of-mass. Observations with the Spitzer Space Telescope failed to directly detect the planet, which put an upper limit on the mass of 5–6 Jupiter masses. Investigation of a separate pulsation mode revealed timing variations in antiphase with the variations in the originally-analysed pulsation mode. This would not be the case if the variations were caused by an orbiting planet, and thus the timing variations must have a different cause. This illustrates the potential dangers of attempting to detect planets by white dwarf pulsation timing.
