= PSR B1828−11 =

Pulsar in the constellation Scutum

Observation data Epoch J2000.0 Equinox ICRS
- Constellation: Scutum
- Right ascension: 18^{h} 30^{m} 47.75^{s}
- Declination: −10° 59′ 10.8″

Characteristics
- Spectral type: Pulsar

Astrometry
Distance	10,000 ly (3,200 pc)

Details
Rotation	0.405093982953 s

Other designations
- PSR J1830−1059, PSR B1828−10

Database references
SIMBAD	data

PSR B1828−11 (also known as PSR B1828−10) is a pulsar with a spin period of 0.405 seconds approximately 10,000 light-years away in the constellation of Scutum. The star exhibits variations in the timing and shape of its pulses: this was at one stage interpreted as due to a possible planetary system in orbit around the pulsar, though the model required an anomalously large second period derivative of the pulse times. The planetary model was later discarded in favour of precession effects as the planets could not cause the observed shape variations of the pulses. It has also been proposed the pulsar is a quark star undergoing forced precession due to an orbiting "quark planet", though the entry for the pulsar on SIMBAD lists this hypothesis as being controversial.
