= DH Tauri =

Star in the constellation Taurus

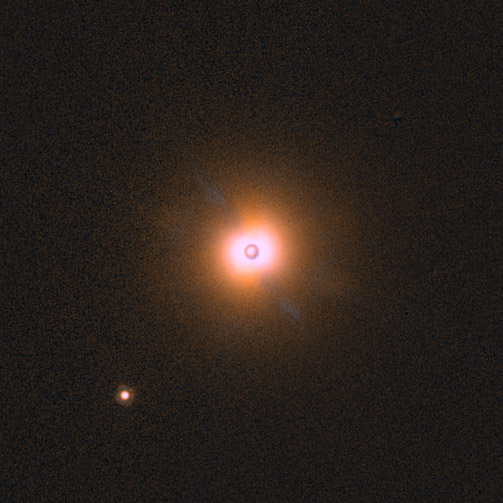
- DH Tauri and the b companion (lower left) with the Very Large Telescope; Credit: ESO VLT SPHERE; Van Holstein et al.; Processing: Meli_thev

Observation data Epoch J2000.0 Equinox ICRS
- Constellation: Taurus
- DI Tauri
- Right ascension: 04^{h} 29^{m} 42.472^{s}
- Declination: +26° 32′ 49.13″
- DH Tauri
- Right ascension: 04^{h} 29^{m} 41.553^{s}
- Declination: +26° 32′ 58.13″
- Apparent magnitude (V): 13.1

Characteristics
- Evolutionary stage: pre-main sequence
- Spectral type: M0-M1Ve(T)
- Variable type: T Tau

Astrometry
Proper motion (μ)	RA: 6.603 mas/yr Dec.: −20.871 mas/yr
Parallax (π)	7.4936±0.0255 mas
Distance	435 ± 1 ly (133.4 ± 0.5 pc)

Details

DI Tauri
Radius	1.21 R_{☉}
Luminosity	0.357 L_{☉}
Temperature	4,058 K

DH Tauri
Mass	0.41 M_{☉}
Radius	1.26 R_{☉}
Luminosity	0.22 L_{☉}
Temperature	3,751 K
Age	3.16 Myr

Other designations
- DH Tau, WDS J04297+2633B, IRAS 04267+2626, 2MASS J04294155+2632582

Database references
SIMBAD	data

DH Tauri, also known as DH Tau, is a type M star, located 140 parsecs (456.619 light years) away. It forms a binary system with DI Tauri 15″ away, and has a substellar companion, either a brown dwarf or massive exoplanet.

== Characteristics ==
DH Tauri is a type M, or red dwarf star, one of the most common types of star in the Milky Way. It has an apparent magnitude of 13.71 and temperature of 3,751 K. DH Tauri has a mass of 0.41 M_{☉} and an estimated radius of 1.26 R_{☉}, which is unusually large for a red dwarf.

The companion DH Tauri B or b has a mass estimated to be between eight M_{J} and 50 M_{J}, making it either a super-Jupiter or brown dwarf. Other sources give a mass as high as 0.03 M_{☉}, with a bolometric luminosity of 0.01 L_{☉}. The spectral type has been classified as M7.5 or M9.25. The companion has detected water vapor and carbon monoxide in its atmosphere and has a rotational velocity of 9.6 ± 0.7 km/s. This is between 9 and 15% of the breakup speed of DH Tau B. This low rotation is in agreement with magnetic coupling to a circumplanetary disk in the late stages of accretion, which reduces angular momentum of the companion. The companion, while its host star still having a protoplanetary disk, is still accreting material, being surrounded by a circumsubstellar disk (possibly a circumplanetary disk, depending on its formation history). It may have an orbiting candidate companion DH Tauri Bb, possibly an exomoon with 1 M_{J}, and a mass ratio with respect to the brown dwarf of one-tenth. However, the existence of this companion is uncertain, as its detection may be an artifact of instrumental effects.

The DH Tauri planetary system
Companion (in order from star)	Mass	Semimajor axis (AU)	Orbital period (days)	Eccentricity	Inclination (°)	Radius
b	8.4±1.1, 12.6±2.5 M_{J}	234+102 −41	5,500+4,500 −1,600	0.58+0.32 −0.26	88+11 −13	2.51±0.16 R_{J}
