= Gamma Cephei Ab =

Jovian planet orbiting γ Cephei A

γ Cephei Ab / Tadmor
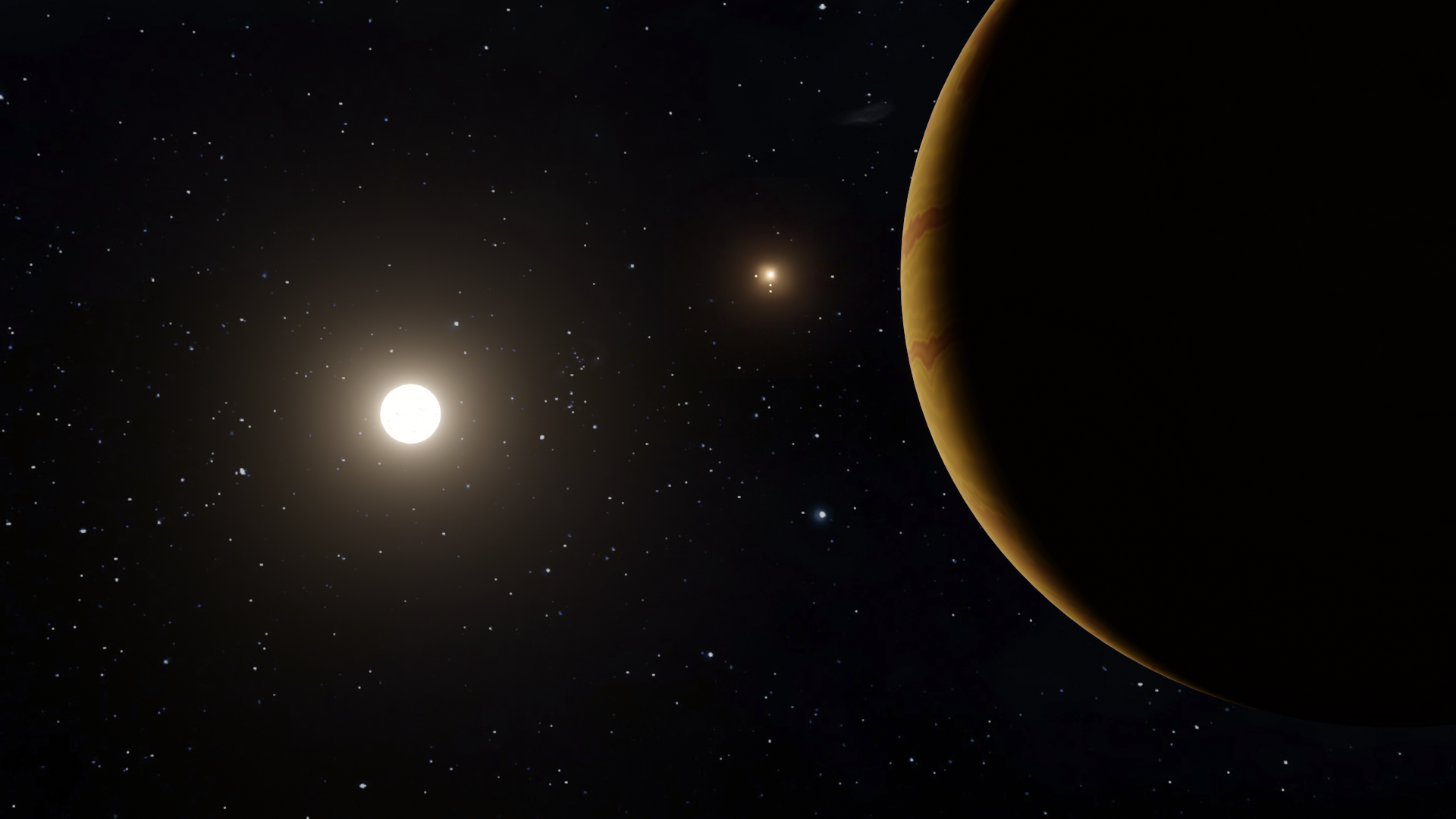
- Artist impression of Tadmor, its host and the faint Gamma Cephei B.

Discovery
- Discovered by: Bruce Campbell, Gordon Walker, Stephenson Yang, Hatzes et al.
- Discovery site: United States
- Discovery date: 13 July 1988 (suspected); 7 May 2003 (confirmed)
- Detection method: Doppler spectroscopy

Orbital characteristics
- Semi-major axis: 1.978±0.007 AU
- Eccentricity: 0.07±0.03
- Orbital period (sidereal): 2.475±0.002 years
- Time of periastron: 2,455,980+46 −50 days
- Argument of periastron: 295°±20°
- Star: γ Cephei A

Physical characteristics
- Mass: ≥1.62±0.04 M_{J}

Gamma Cephei Ab (abbreviated γ Cephei Ab, γ Cep Ab), formally named Tadmor /ˈtædmɔːr/, is an exoplanet approximately 45 light-years away in the constellation of Cepheus that orbits Gamma Cephei A. The planet was suspected to exist in 1988, and later confirmed in 2003, technically making it the first exoplanet discovered.

== Naming ==
In July 2014 the International Astronomical Union (IAU) launched NameExoWorlds, a process for giving proper names to certain exoplanets. The process involved public nomination and voting for the new names. In December 2015, the IAU announced the winning name for this planet was Tadmor. It was submitted by the Syrian Astronomical Association and is the ancient Semitic name and modern Arabic name for the city of Palmyra, a (UNESCO) World Heritage Site.

== Detection and discovery ==
=== 1988 claims ===
The first indications of γ Cephei Ab were reported in July 1988. The planet was tentatively identified by a Canadian team of astronomers, which was led by Bruce Campbell, Gordon Walker and Stephenson Yang, while its existence was also announced by Anthony Lawton and P. Wright in 1989. Though not confirmed, this would have been the first true discovery of an extrasolar planet, and it was hypothesized based on the same radial velocity technique later used successfully by others. However, the claim was retracted in 1992 due to the quality of the data not being good enough to make a solid discovery.

=== 2003 confirmation ===
On 7 May 2003, γ Cephei Ab was finally confirmed. The team of astronomers (including William D. Cochran, Artie P. Hatzes, et al.) at the Planetary Systems and their Formation Workshop announced the preliminary confirmation of a long-suspected planet γ Cephei Ab with a minimum mass of 1.59 M_{J} (1.59 times that of Jupiter). The parameters were later recalculated when direct detection of the secondary star γ Cephei B allowed astronomers to better constrain the properties of the system. γ Cephei Ab moves in an elliptical orbit with a semimajor axis of 2.044 AU which takes almost two and a half years to complete. The eccentricity is 0.115, which means it moves between 1.81 and 2.28 AU in orbital distance around γ Cephei A, which would place it from slightly beyond the orbit of Mars to the inner asteroid belt in the Solar System.

=== Astrometric observations ===
Hipparcos data taken in 2006 constrains its mass below "13.3 M_{J} at the 95% confidence level, and 16.9 M_{J} at the 99.73% (3 σ) confidence level". This is not much to go on, but it is enough to verify that it is not another unseen brown or red dwarf. A 2011 paper using the re-reduction of Hipparcos data found a mass between 6.6 and 28.1 M_{J} at the 3 σ confidence level, with a median value of 17.9 M_{J}, placing the companion as either a massive gas giant or low-mass brown dwarf.

In 2018, Hubble astrometric observations revealed the true mass of γ Cephei Ab to be 9.4 M_{J}.

One 2026 study, however, noted inconsistencies between the astrometric inclination (and consequently mass) and longitude of the node estimates, making the planet's true mass uncertain. The 2018 mass measurement for the planet also relies in an inclination for the companion star of 101.5°, much lower than typical values.

== See also ==
- 51 Pegasi b
- HD 114762 b
- Iota Horologii b
- PSR B1257+12 B
- PSR B1257+12 C
- Lists of stars
- Sun
