= HD 114762 b =

Star in the constellation Coma Berenices

Observation data Epoch J2000 Equinox ICRS
- Constellation: Coma Berenices
- Right ascension: 13^{h} 12^{m} 19.7428^{s}
- Declination: +17° 31′ 01.654″

Astrometry
Distance	126±2 ly (38.6±0.7 pc)

Orbit
Primary	HD 114762
Period (P)	83.915±0.003 d
Semi-major axis (a)	0.375±0.006 AU
Eccentricity (e)	0.566+0.012 −0.011
Inclination (i)	6.23+1.97 −1.26°
Periastron epoch (T)	2449889.106±0.186
Argument of periastron (ω) (secondary)	201.3±1.0°
Semi-amplitude (K_{2}) (secondary)	612.48±3.52 km/s

Details
Mass	0.293+0.103 −0.056 M_{☉}

Database references
SIMBAD	data

HD 114762 b is a small red dwarf star in the constellation of Coma Berenices. It is an optically undetected companion to the late F-type main-sequence star HD 114762. The system is located at a distance of approximately 126 light-years (38.6 pc) from the Sun.

The companion was discovered in 1989 by Latham, et al., and confirmed in an October 1991 paper by Cochran, et al. Initially, it was thought to be the first discovered exoplanet (although its existence was confirmed after those around PSR B1257+12), and was believed to be a gas giant.

The object orbits the primary star every 83.9 days at an approximate distance of 0.37 AU, with an orbital eccentricity of 0.57; for comparison, this orbit is similar to that of Mercury but with almost three times the eccentricity. Based on the radial velocity measurements alone, it was estimated to have a minimum mass of 11.069±0.063 M_{J} (at 90°) and a probable mass of approximately 63.2 M_{J} (at 10°). However, analysis of its astrometric perturbation of its host star in 2019 found it to have an extremely low inclination of only 6.23+1.97
−1.26 degrees, giving it a true mass of 107+20
−27 M_{J} and putting it well outside of the range of planetary masses (less than 13 M_{J}). Further estimates have revised this up to 0.293 solar masses.

HD 114762 b was thought for a time to be the first extrasolar planet ever detected, predating the discoveries of planets orbiting PSR B1257+12 and main-sequence star 51 Pegasi, in 1992 and 1995, respectively. However, now that it has been found to not be a planet, the planets found orbiting PSR B1257+12 were indeed the first exoplanets ever found.

At an event celebrating the career of discoverer David Latham and attended by his colleagues and collaborators, the object was informally dubbed "Latham's Planet". However, this name has no official standing with the International Astronomical Union.

== See also ==
- 51 Pegasi b
- Gamma Cephei Ab
