= PSR B1257+12 B =

Super-Earth orbiting PSR B1257+12

PSR B1257+12 B / Poltergeist
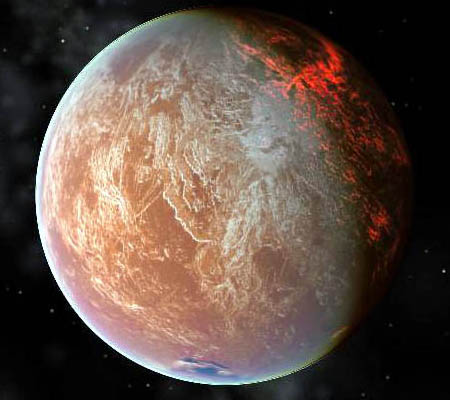
- Artist's impression image of the planet Poltergeist

Discovery
- Discovered by: Aleksander Wolszczan
- Discovery site: Poland
- Discovery date: 22 January 1992
- Detection method: Pulsar timing

Orbital characteristics
- Semi-major axis: 0.36 AU (54 million km)
- Eccentricity: 0.0186 ± 0.0002
- Orbital period (sidereal): 66.5419 ± 0.0001 d
- Inclination: 53 ± 4 (Note: The method used to determine the inclination includes a degeneracy because of the impossibility of determining whether the orbital motion is clockwise or anticlockwise. The alternate value of the inclination is 127 ± 4°.)
- Time of periastron: 2,449,768.1 ± 0.1
- Argument of periastron: 250.4 ± 0.6
- Star: Lich

Physical characteristics
- Mean radius: 1.91 R_{🜨}
- Mass: 4.3 ± 0.2 M_{🜨}
- Temperature: 193 K (−80 °C; −112 °F)

PSR B1257+12 c, alternatively designated PSR B1257+12 B, also named Poltergeist, is an extrasolar planet approximately 2,300 light-years away in the constellation of Virgo. It was one of the first planets ever discovered outside the Solar System, and is one of three pulsar planets known to be orbiting the pulsar Lich.

Over four times as massive as the Earth, it circles the primary at a distance of 0.36 AU with an orbital period of approximately 66 days. Because it and Phobetor have very similar masses and orbit close to each other, they were expected to cause measurable perturbations in each other's orbits. Detecting such perturbations confirmed that the planets were real. Accurate masses of the two planets, as well as their inclinations, were calculated from how much the planets perturb each other.

== Nomenclature ==
The convention that arose for designating pulsars was that of using the letters PSR (pulsating source of radio) followed by the pulsar's right ascension and degrees of declination. The modern convention prefixes the older numbers with a B meaning the coordinates are for the 1950.0 epoch. All new pulsars have a J indicating 2000.0 coordinates and also have declination including minutes. Pulsars that were discovered before 1993 tend to retain their B names rather than use their J names, but all pulsars have a J name that provides more precise coordinates of its location in the sky.

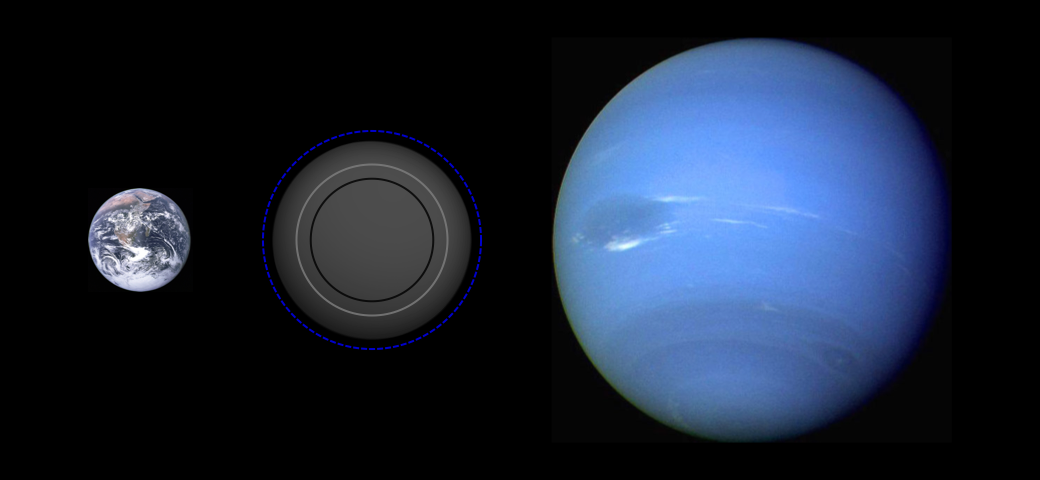
Size comparison of Poltergeist with Earth and Neptune (Based on selected hypothetical modeled compositions)

On its discovery, the planet was designated PSR 1257+12 B and later PSR B1257+12 B. It was discovered before the convention that extrasolar planets receive designations consisting of the star's name followed by lower-case Roman letters starting from "b" was established. However, it is listed under the latter convention on astronomical databases such as SIMBAD and the Extrasolar Planets Encyclopedia. Hence the designation PSR B1257+12 c.

In July 2014, the International Astronomical Union launched NameExoWorlds, a process for giving proper names to certain exoplanets and their host stars. The process involved public nomination and voting for the new names. In December 2015, the IAU announced the winning name was Poltergeist for this planet. The winning name was submitted by the Planetarium Südtirol Alto Adige in Karneid, Italy. Poltergeist is a name for supernatural beings that create physical disturbances, from the German word for "noisy ghost".

== See also ==
- List of exoplanets discovered before 2000 – PSR B1257+12 B c
