= NGC 3114 =

Open cluster in the constellation Carina

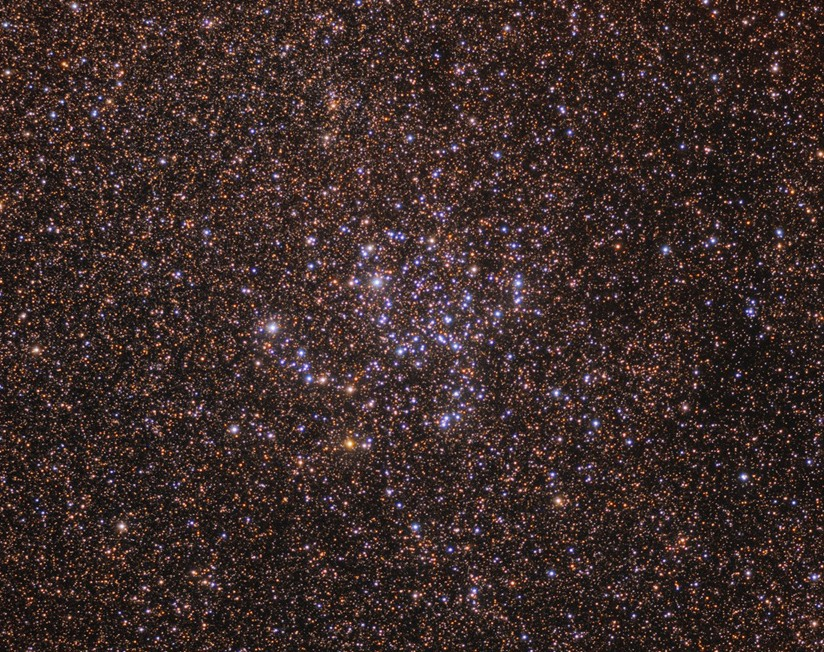
- Open cluster NGC 3114 in Carina

Observation data (J2000 epoch)
- Right ascension: 10^{h} 02^{m} 42^{s}
- Declination: −60° 06′ 0″
- Apparent magnitude (V): + 4.2

Physical characteristics
- Other designations: Cr 215

Associations
- Constellation: Carina

NGC 3114 is a sparse open cluster which is projected onto the outskirts of the Carina complex.

Because of the high number of field stars from the disc of the Milky Way, it is very difficult object to study as this contamination makes its size ambiguous.

== Studies of NGC 3114 ==
NGC 3114 has first been subject of studies in 1963, when Jankowitz and McCosh obtained photographic UBV photometry for 171 of its stars and photoelectric UBV photometry of 52 stars. They estimated the cluster to be 910 parsecs from the Sun, its mean visual extinction $E(B-V) = 0.27$ and its age to range from $6\times 10^{7}$ and $2\times 10^{8}$ years.

In 1988, Schneider and Weiss obtained photometry data for 122 stars, revising the cluster reddening to be $E(B-V) = 0.03$.

Three years later, Sagar and Sharpless made the largest data recording of the cluster to date, obtaining BV CCD photometry of around 350 stars from seven 3.6'×5.4' regions. Because these regions were rather far from the cluster centre, a substantial contamination was expected. Nevertheless, by assuming the cluster reddening value obtained by Schneider and Weiss, they found the cluster to be $940 \pm 60$ pc, which agreed with the measurements taken 28 years previously by Jankowitz and McCosh. They also found the age of the cluster to be $1-2 \times 10^{8}$ years.

Finally, in 1989 Claria' et al. estimated the cluster chemical abundance, finding that NGC 3114 has basically the same metal richness as the Sun, for which $[Fe/H] = -0.04\pm0.04$ (Fe - Iron, H - Hydrogen).

== Gallery ==
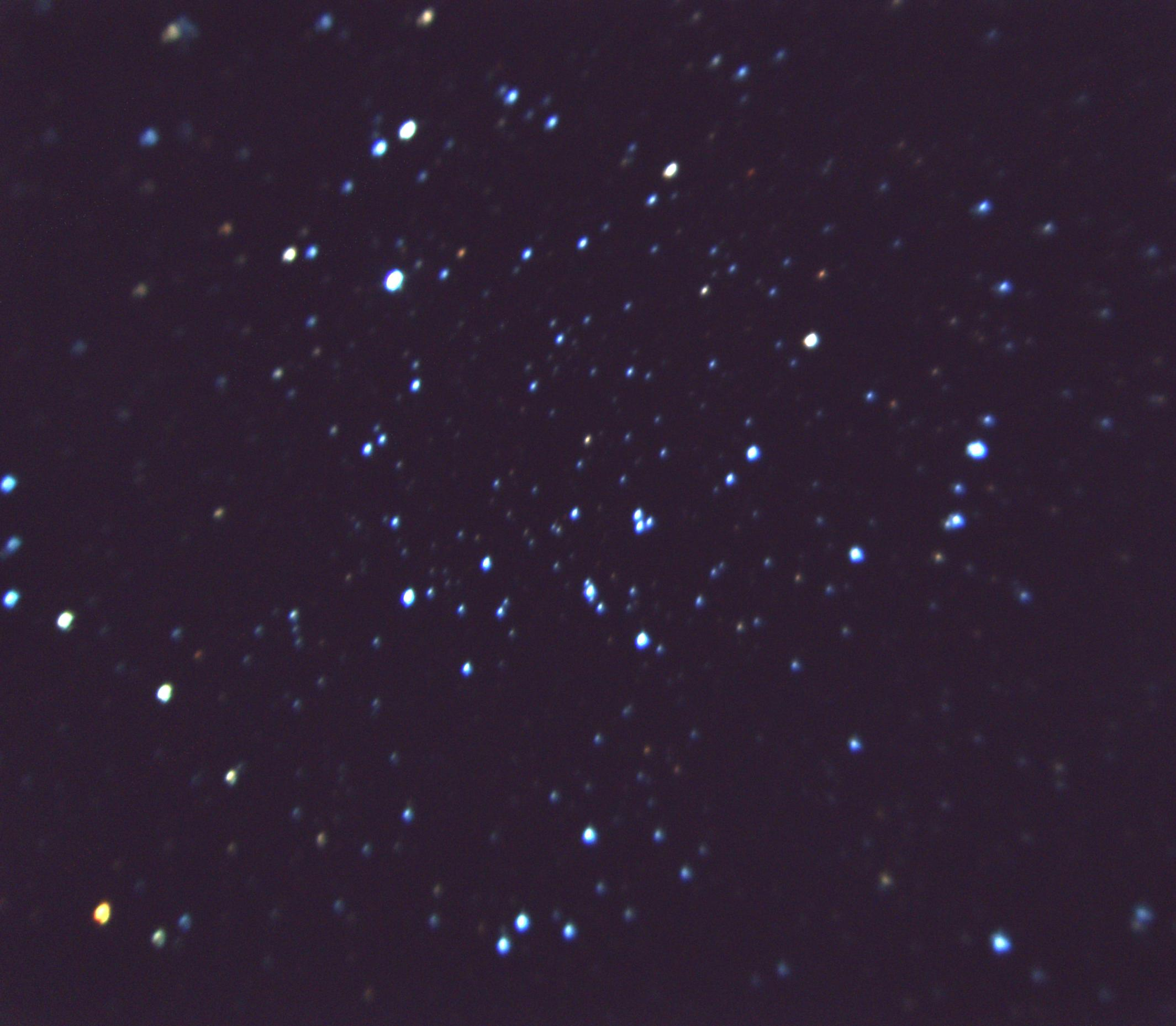
NGC 3114 from a 5 inches reflector

== See also ==
- List of open clusters
- Open cluster family
- Open cluster remnant
- Star clusters
- Stellar associations
