= Kraken galaxy =

Hypothetical galaxy

Observation data
- Constellation: various
- Group or cluster: Local Group

The Kraken galaxy is a hypothetical galaxy that is proposed to have collided and merged with the Milky Way around 11 billion years ago. The Kraken contributed at least 13 (9%) of the surviving 150 globular clusters to the Milky Way. Its existence was first proposed in 2020.

== See also ==
- Sausage Galaxy, dwarf galaxy merged into Milky Way being its last major merger, cause for the Milky Way's thick disc and many halo stars.
- List of open clusters
- List of spiral galaxies
- Open cluster family
- Open cluster remnant
