= Beehive Cluster =

Open cluster in the constellation Cancer

Messier 44 / Beehive Cluster
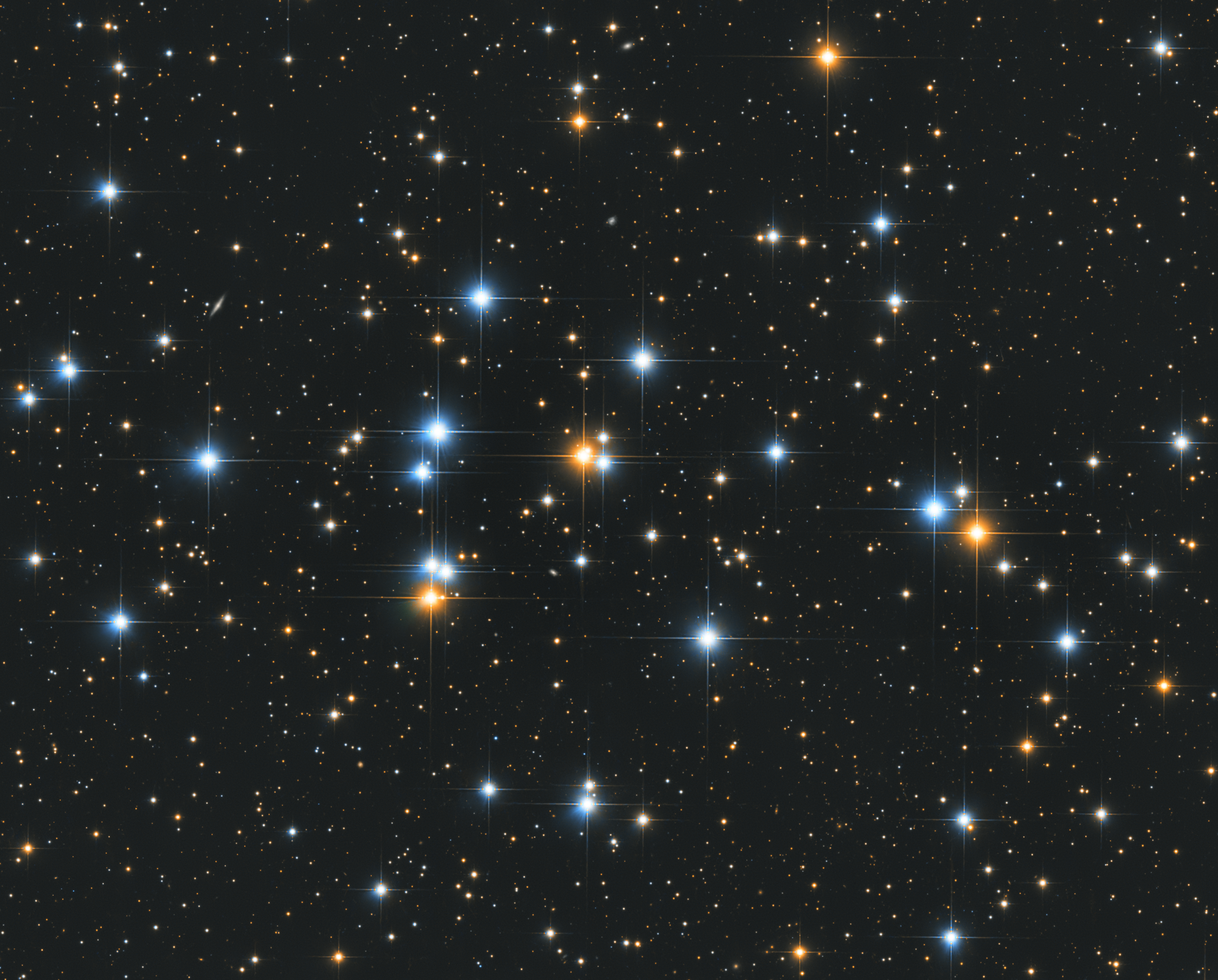
- The Beehive Cluster in Cancer constellation (north is to the right)

Observation data (J2000.0 epoch)
- Right ascension: 08^{h} 40.4^{m}
- Declination: 19° 59′
- Distance: 610 ly (187 pc)
- Apparent magnitude (V): 3.7
- Apparent dimensions (V): 95′

Physical characteristics
- Mass: ~500–600 M_{☉}
- Radius: 11.42 ly
- Estimated age: ~600–700 million years
- Other designations: Praesepe, M44, NGC 2632, Cr 189

Associations
- Constellation: Cancer

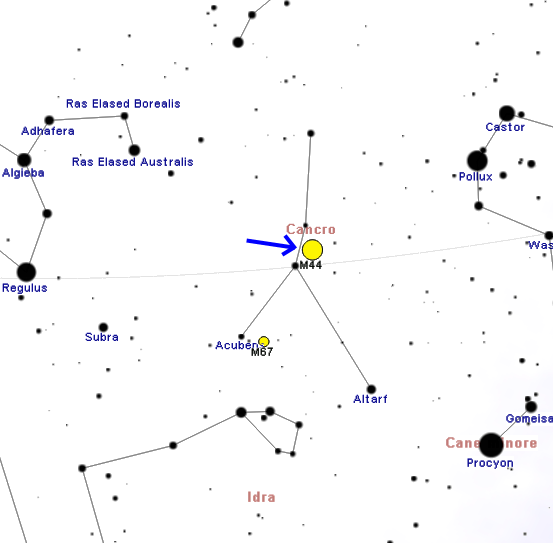
Map showing the location of M44 in the constellation of Cancer

The Beehive Cluster (also known as Praesepe (Latin for "manger", "cot" or "crib"), M44, NGC 2632, or Cr 189) is an open cluster in the constellation Cancer. One of the nearest open clusters to Earth, it contains a larger population of stars than other nearby bright open clusters holding around 1,000 stars. Under dark skies, the Beehive Cluster looks like a small nebulous object to the naked eye, and has been known since ancient times. Classical astronomer Ptolemy described it as a "nebulous mass in the breast of Cancer". It was among the first objects that Galileo studied with his telescope.

Its age and proper motion coincide with those of the Hyades, suggesting they may share similar origins. Both clusters also contain red giants and white dwarfs, which represent later stages of stellar evolution, along with many main sequence stars.

The distance to M44 is often cited to be between 160 and 187 parsecs (520–610 light years), but the revised Hipparcos parallaxes (2009) for Praesepe members and the latest infrared color-magnitude diagram favors an analogous distance of 182 pc. There are better age estimates of around 600 million years (compared to about 625 million years for the Hyades). The diameter of the bright inner cluster core is about 7.0 parsecs (23 light years).

At 1.5° across, the cluster easily fits within the field of view of binoculars or low-powered small telescopes. Regulus, Castor, and Pollux are guide stars.

== History ==
In 1609, Galileo first telescopically observed the Beehive and was able to resolve it into 40 stars. Charles Messier added it to his famous catalog in 1769 after precisely measuring its position in the sky. Along with the Orion Nebula and the Pleiades cluster, Messier's inclusion of the Beehive has been noted as curious, as most of Messier's objects were much fainter and more easily confused with comets. Another possibility is that Messier simply wanted to have a larger catalog than his scientific rival Lacaille, whose 1755 catalog contained 42 objects, and so he added some well-known bright objects to boost his list. Wilhelm Schur, as director of the Göttingen Observatory, drew a map of the cluster in 1894.

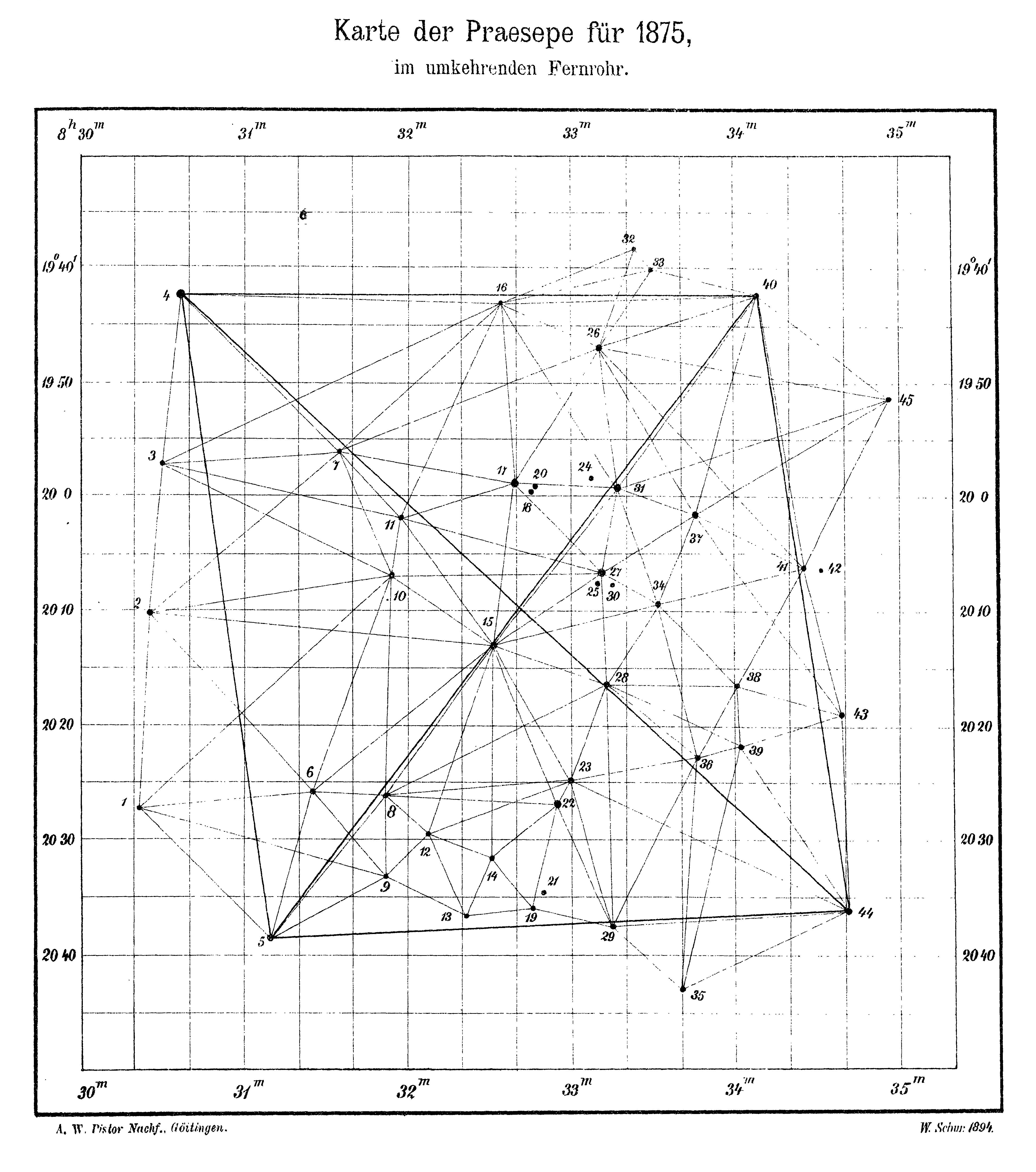
Wilhelm Schur's map of the Beehive Cluster in 1894

Ancient Greeks and Romans saw this object as a manger from which two donkeys, the adjacent stars Asellus Borealis and Asellus Australis, are eating; these are the donkeys that Dionysos and Silenus rode into battle against the Titans.

Hipparchus (c.130 BC) refers to the cluster as Nephelion ("Little Cloud") in his star catalog. Claudius Ptolemy's Almagest includes the Beehive Cluster as one of seven "nebulae" (four of which are real), describing it as "The Nebulous Mass in the Breast (of Cancer)". Aratus (c.260–270 BC) calls the cluster Achlus or "Little Mist" in his poem Phainomena.

Johann Bayer showed the cluster as a nebulous star on his Uranometria atlas of 1603, and labeled it Epsilon. The letter is now applied specifically to the brightest star of the cluster Epsilon Cancri, of magnitude 6.29. Bayer also cited the name Melleff or Meeleph for the cluster, from Arabic Al Ma'laf, the Stall; as Meleph, this name is also now applied specifically to the star Epsilon Cancri.

This perceived nebulous object is in the Ghost (Gui Xiu), the 23rd lunar mansion of ancient Chinese astrology. Ancient Chinese skywatchers saw this as a ghost or demon riding in a carriage and likened its appearance to a "cloud of pollen blown from willow catkins". It was also known by the somewhat less romantic name of Jishi qi (積屍氣, also transliterated Tseih She Ke), the "Exhalation of Piled-up Corpses". It is also known simply as Jishi (積屍), "cumulative corpses".

== Morphology and composition ==
Like many star clusters of all kinds, Praesepe has experienced mass segregation. This means that bright massive stars are concentrated in the cluster's core, while dimmer and less massive stars populate its halo (sometimes called the corona). The cluster's core radius is estimated at 3.5 parsecs (11.4 light years); its half-mass radius is about 3.9 parsecs (12.7 light years); and its tidal radius is about 12 parsecs (39 light years). However, the tidal radius also includes many stars that are merely "passing through" and not bona fide cluster members.

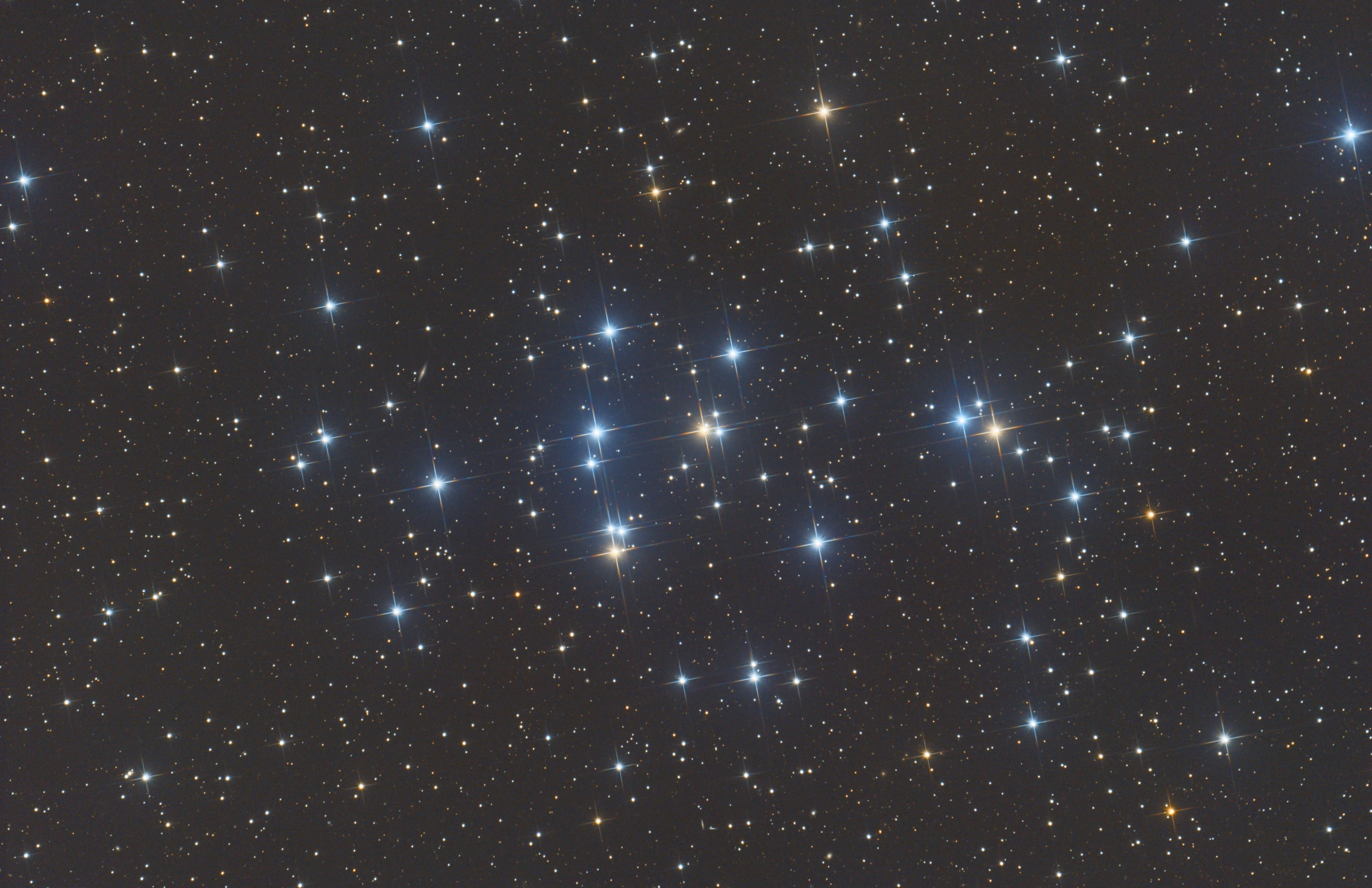
The Beehive Cluster in Cancer

Altogether, the cluster contains at least 1000 gravitationally bound stars, for a total mass of about 500–600 Solar masses. A recent survey counts 1010 high-probability members, of which 68% are M dwarfs, 30% are Sun-like stars of spectral classes F, G, and K, and about 2% are bright stars of spectral class A. Also present are five giant stars, four of which have spectral class K0 III and the fifth G0 III.

So far, eleven white dwarfs have been identified, representing the final evolutionary phase of the cluster's most massive stars, which originally belonged to spectral type B. Brown dwarfs, however, are rare in this cluster, probably because they have been lost by tidal stripping from the halo. A brown dwarf has been found in the eclipsing binary system AD 3116.

The cluster has a visual brightness of magnitude 3.7. Its brightest stars are blue-white and of magnitude 6 to 6.5. 42 Cancri is a confirmed member.

== Planets ==
In September 2012, two planets which orbit separate stars were discovered in the Beehive Cluster. The finding was significant for being the first planets detected orbiting stars like Earth's Sun that were situated in stellar clusters. Planets had previously been detected in such clusters, but not orbiting stars like the Sun.

The planets have been designated Pr0201 b and Pr0211 b. The 'b' at the end of their names indicates that the bodies are planets. The discoveries are what have been termed hot Jupiters, massive gas giants that, unlike the planet Jupiter, orbit very close to their parent stars.

The announcement describing the planetary finds, written by Sam Quinn as the lead author, was published in the Astrophysical Journal Letters. Quinn's team worked with David Latham of the Harvard–Smithsonian Center for Astrophysics, utilizing the Smithsonian Astrophysical Observatory's Fred Lawrence Whipple Observatory.

In 2016 additional observations found a second planet in the Pr0211 system, Pr0211 c. This made Pr0211 the first multi-planet system to be discovered in an open cluster.

The Kepler space telescope, in its K2 mission, discovered planets around several more stars in the Beehive Cluster. The stars K2-95, K2-100, K2-101, K2-102, K2-103, and K2-104 host a single planet each, and K2-264 has a two-planet system.

== Gallery ==
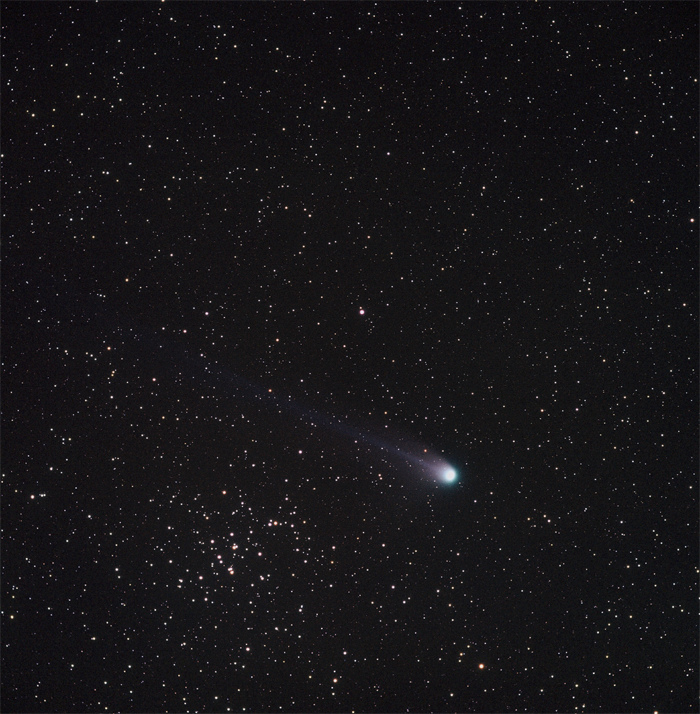
Photo of comet C/2001 Q4 (NEAT) next to Messier 44

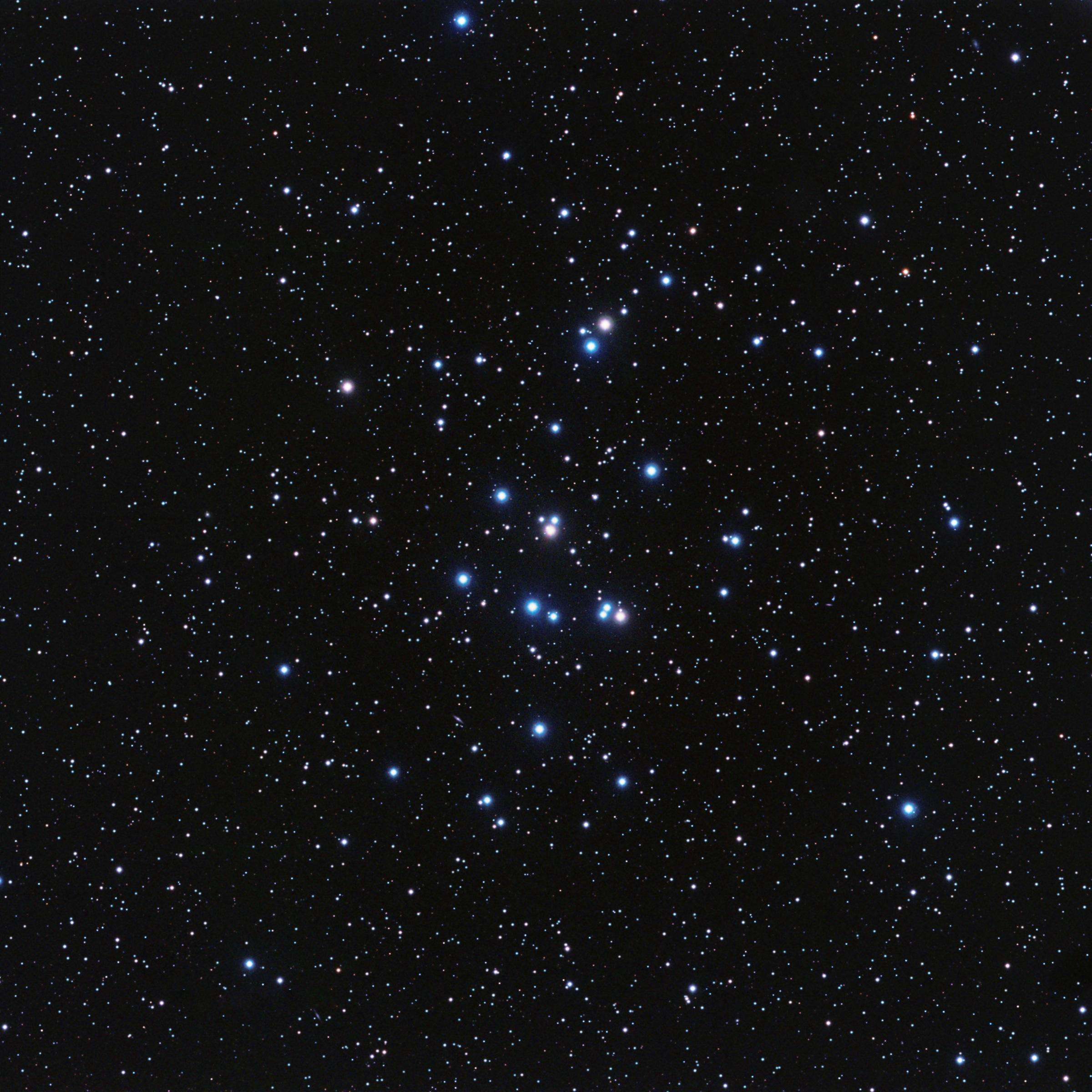
Widefield image of the Beehive Cluster

Composite time-lapse showing Mars (upper track, April–May 2025) and Venus (lower track, August–September 2025) passing through the Beehive Cluster. Image by Petr Horálek.

== See also ==
- List of Messier objects
- Cancer (Chinese astronomy)
- List of open clusters
- Messier object
- New General Catalogue
- Open cluster family
- Open cluster remnant
