= Pr0211 =

Sun-like star

Observation data Epoch J2000 Equinox J2000
- Constellation: Cancer
- Right ascension: 08^{h} 42^{m} 11.49887^{s}
- Declination: +19° 16′ 37.2375″
- Apparent magnitude (V): 12.143

Characteristics
- Evolutionary stage: Main sequence
- Spectral type: K1V or late G
- Apparent magnitude (G): 11.926±0.003
- Apparent magnitude (J): 10.660±0.022
- Apparent magnitude (H): 10.242±0.019
- Apparent magnitude (K): 10.173±0.016

Astrometry
Radial velocity (R_{v})	35.37±0.42 km/s
Proper motion (μ)	RA: −36.820 mas/yr Dec.: −12.384 mas/yr
Parallax (π)	5.4387±0.0184 mas
Distance	600 ± 2 ly (183.9 ± 0.6 pc)

Details
Mass	0.935±0.013 M_{☉}
Radius	0.827±0.012 R_{☉}
Surface gravity (log g)	4.51±0.05 cgs
Temperature	5300±30 K
Metallicity [Fe/H]	0.18±0.02 dex
Rotation	7.97 days
Rotational velocity (v sin i)	5.1±0.3 km/s
Age	578±12 or 790±30 Myr

Other designations
- Pr0211, EPIC 211936827, TIC 175291727, 2MASS J08421149+1916373, NGC 2632 JC 278

Database references
SIMBAD	data
Exoplanet Archive	data

Pr0211 (sometimes written Pr 0211, also 2MASS J08421149+1916373) is a Sun-like late G or early K-type main-sequence star in the Beehive Cluster, or Praesepe, located 600 light-years away in the constellation Cancer. It is rotationally variable and has a rotation period of 7.97 days, with its spin axis at an inclination of 76°±11° to the plane of the sky. Pr0211 hosts two known exoplanets, and was the first multi-planet system to be discovered in an open cluster.

Pr0211 forms a double star system with a K-type main-sequence star known as NGC 2632 JC 280 or 2MASS J08421285+1916040. Although the stars share a similar distance and common proper motion, their relative space velocity appears to be high enough that the pair are not gravitationally bound.

== Planetary system ==
Pr0211 b is a gas giant exoplanet, specifically a hot Jupiter, orbiting around Pr0211. Pr0211 b along with Pr0201 b are notable for being the first exoplanets discovered in the Beehive Cluster. Pr0211 b and Pr0201 b were discovered in 2012 by Sam Quinn and his colleagues while observing 53 stars in the Beehive Cluster using the 1.5 metres (4.9 ft; 1.6 yd) telescope at the University of Georgia in the United States.

Pr0211 c is a gas giant exoplanet orbiting around Pr0211. Pr0211 c was discovered in 2016 by Luca Malavolta and his colleagues while observing its host star with the HARPS-N spectrograph on the 3.6 metres (12 ft; 3.9 yd) Italian Telescopio Nazionale Galileo (TNG) in La Palma, and the Tillinghast Reflector Echelle Spectrograph (TRES) mounted at the 1.5 metres (4.9 ft; 1.6 yd) telescope at the University of Georgia in the United States.

The Pr0211 planetary system
Companion (in order from star)	Mass	Semimajor axis (AU)	Orbital period (days)	Eccentricity	Inclination	Radius
b	≥1.88±0.03 M_{J}	0.03176±0.00015	2.14610±0.00003	0.011+0.012 −0.008	—	—
c	≥7.79±0.33 M_{J}	5.5+3.0 −1.4	4850+4560 −1750	0.71±0.11	—	—
