= Klinkerfues =

Klinkerfues may refer to:

- Ernst Friedrich Wilhelm Klinkerfues (1827–1884), German astronomer
- 112328 Klinkerfues, a main belt asteroid named after the astronomer
- Comet Klinkerfues (disambiguation)
