= Adolf Gaspary =

German Romance philologist

Adolf Gaspary (23 May 1849, in Berlin – 17 March 1892, in Berlin) was a German Romance philologist, specializing in Italian literature.

From 1868, he studied philosophy and art history at the Friedrich Wilhelm University of Berlin, the Ludwig-Maximilians-Universität München, and the University of Freiburg, receiving his promotion in 1873 (doctoral advisor, Friedrich Harms). In 1873–1875 he took a study trip to France, Spain, Portugal and Italy—in Naples he came under the influence of Francesco De Sanctis. He furthered his studies with Adolf Tobler at the University of Berlin, where in 1878 he obtained his habilitation with a thesis on the Sicilian poetry school of the 13th century, Die sicilianische Dichterschule des dreizehnten Jahrhunderts. In 1880, he relocated to the University of Breslau as an associate professor of Romance philology, receiving a full professorship in 1883. In 1891, he accepted a position at the University of Göttingen, but soon succumbed to illness, and died the following year in Berlin at the age of 42.

His main work was a history of Italian literature, Geschichte der italienischen Literatur (2 volumes, 1885–1888), that was unfinished at the time of his death:

- Volume 1: Die italienische Literatur im Mittelalter ("Italian literature of the Middle Ages").
- Volume 2: Die Literatur in der Renaissancezeit ("Literature of the Renaissance era").

In 1901 the book The history of early Italian literature to the death of Dante; translated from the German. Together with the author's additions to the Italian translation (1887) and with supplementary bibliographical notes (1887–1899) by Herman Oelsner was published.
