= Wilhelm Schur =

German astronomer (1846–1901)

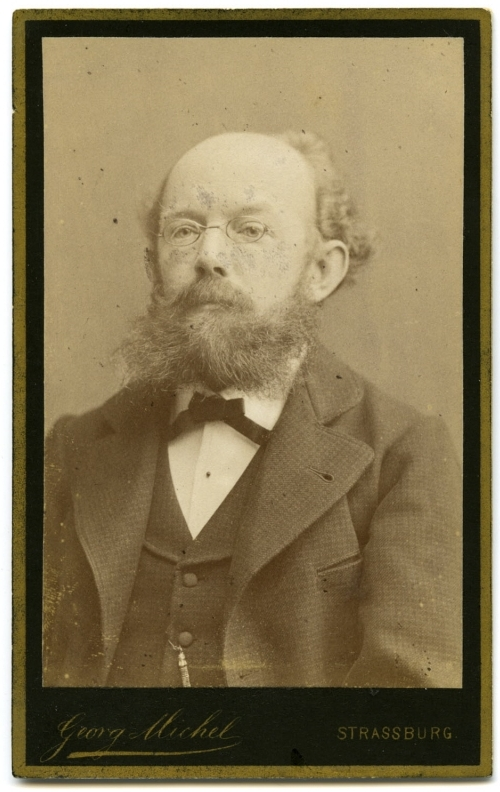
- Wilhelm Schur c. 1873–1886
- Born: Adolph Christian Wilhelm Schur; 15 April 1846; Altona, Hamburg, Germany
- Died: 1 July 1901 (aged 55); Göttingen, Lower Saxony, Germany
- Education: University of Kiel (1864–1865); University of Göttingen (1865–1868); University of Berlin (1868)
- Spouse: Lucie Thorn (m. 1883–1901)
- Awards: Damoiseau Prize (1883)
- Scientific career
- Fields: Astronomy
- Workplaces: Royal Prussian Geodetic Institute (1868–1872); Berlin Observatory (1872–1873); Strasbourg Observatory (1873–1886); University of Göttingen (1886–1901); Göttingen Observatory (1886–1901)
- Thesis: Untersuchungen über die Bahn des Doppelsterns 70 p Ophiuchi (Studies on the orbit of the double star 70 p Ophiuchi) (1867)
- Doctoral advisor: Wilhelm Klinkerfues

Adolph Christian Wilhelm Schur, RAS Associate (15 April 1846 – 1 July 1901) was a German astronomer and professor of astronomy at the University of Göttingen. He held important positions at multiple observatories throughout his career, namely deputy director of the Strasbourg Observatory and director of the Göttingen Observatory. His main work was in astrometry, although he focused on publishing astronomical catalogues in his later life.

== Early life ==
Wilhelm Schur was born on 15 April 1846 in Altona, Hamburg, to the wine merchant Friedrich Wilhelm Schur and his wife Johanna Tormählen. Schur showed mathematical prowess early in his life, entering and winning a mathematics competition organised by the Educational Association of Schleswig-Holstein and Lauenburg at the age of 14. As grandson of Adolph Cornelius Petersen (28 July 1804 – 3 February 1854), the director of the Altona Observatory, Schur took numerous opportunities to acquaint himself with astronomy. Following Petersen's death, he shadowed Heinrich Wilhelm Theodor Seeling, (Note: Heinrich Seeling was a German astronomer. He studied at the University of Kiel from 1854, earning his doctorate before working as a teacher at numerous private institutes. He intermittently worked at various observatories. In 1861 he was an observer at the Macfarlane Observatory in Glasgow and by 1862 he was working at the Altona Observatory. In 1863 he went to Paris.) an astronomer at the observatory, and made numerous simple astronomical observations and calculations.

By 1864 Schur was attending a polytechnic in Hamburg. That summer, he enrolled at the University of Kiel, where he studied mathematics and astronomy under Georg Daniel Eduard Weyer, physics under Gustav Karsten, and philosophy under Friedrich Harms. In the winter semester of 1864/1865 he transferred to the University of Göttingen, where he studied mathematics under Moritz Stern and Karl Hattendorff, physics under Wilhelm Eduard Weber, and astronomy under Wilhelm Klinkerfues, whom Schur was particularly fond of. In April 1867 he published his first astronomical paper, titled "Bahnbestimmung des Doppelsterns Σ 3062" ("Orbit determination of the double star Σ 3062"), in the Astronomische Nachrichten journal. In October of the same year he earned a PhD, under the advisory of Klinkerfues, with a thesis titled "Untersuchungen über die Bahn des Doppelsterns 70 p Ophiuchi" ("Studies on the orbit of the double star 70 p Ophiuchi"). In the winter of 1867/1868 Schur moved to the University of Berlin, where he attended lectures in astronomy by Arthur von Auwers and Wilhelm Foerster and in physics by Heinrich Wilhelm Dove, Johann Christian Poggendorff, and Georg Quincke.

== Career and later life ==
While at the University of Berlin, Schur briefly worked with von Auwers on understanding observations made by English astronomer James Bradley. From November 1868 until the end of 1872 he worked as an assistant at the Royal Prussian Geodetic Institute, doing triangulation work in central Germany. He, however, sought to participate in the observation of the transit of Venus in 1874 and resigned from his post in 1872 to seek any opportunities to fulfill his wishes. He temporarily worked at the Berlin Observatory before being hired as an assistant at the Strasbourg Observatory in July 1873. Under the observatory's director, Friedrich Winnecke, Schur assisted in preparatory work for the expedition and joined the crew when they embarked for Auckland Island in July 1874. They arrived at their observation site in mid-October and observed the transit on December 9, collecting data and finalizing measurements before embarking for home in June 1875. The expedition lasted 111 days in total.

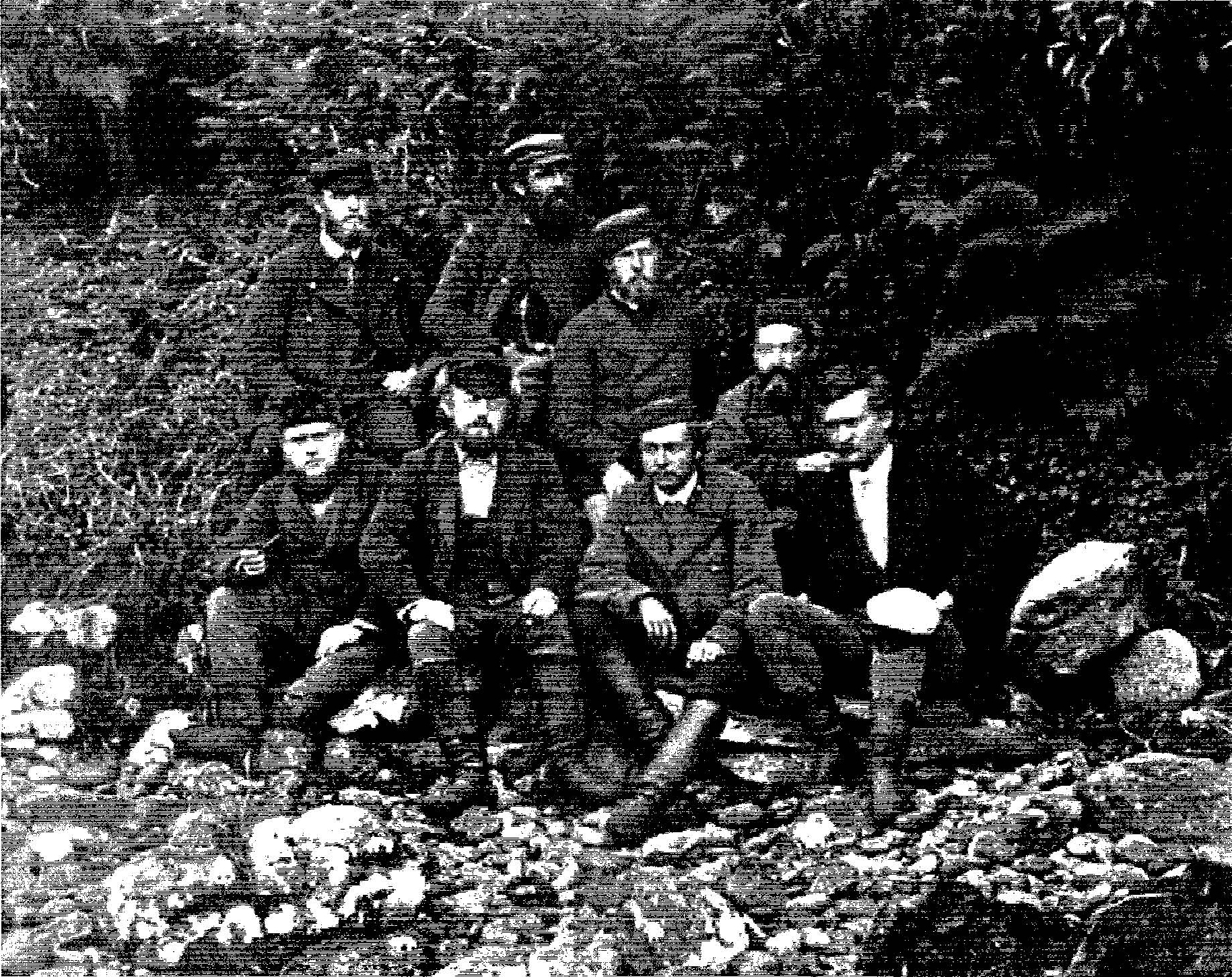
Wilhelm Schur (second from the left, front row) with the 1874 Venus transit expedition crew to Auckland Island.

Upon his return, Schur continued his work at the observatory. He quickly climbed the ranks; he was promoted to an observer in 1877 and, when Winnecke fell ill in 1882, he took over direction of the observatory as deputy director. He oversaw the setup of astronomical instruments at the newly built observatory and made extensive observations and measurements using transit instruments and heliometers. In 1873 he made measurements of Jupiter's bands and in 1883 published "Bestimmung der Masse des Planeten Jupiter aus Heliometer-Beobachtungen der Abstände seiner Satelliten" ("Determination of the mass of the planet Jupiter from heliometer observations of its satellites"). His work throughout this period was mainly focused on the apparent magnitude of variable stars and on the determination of comet orbits.

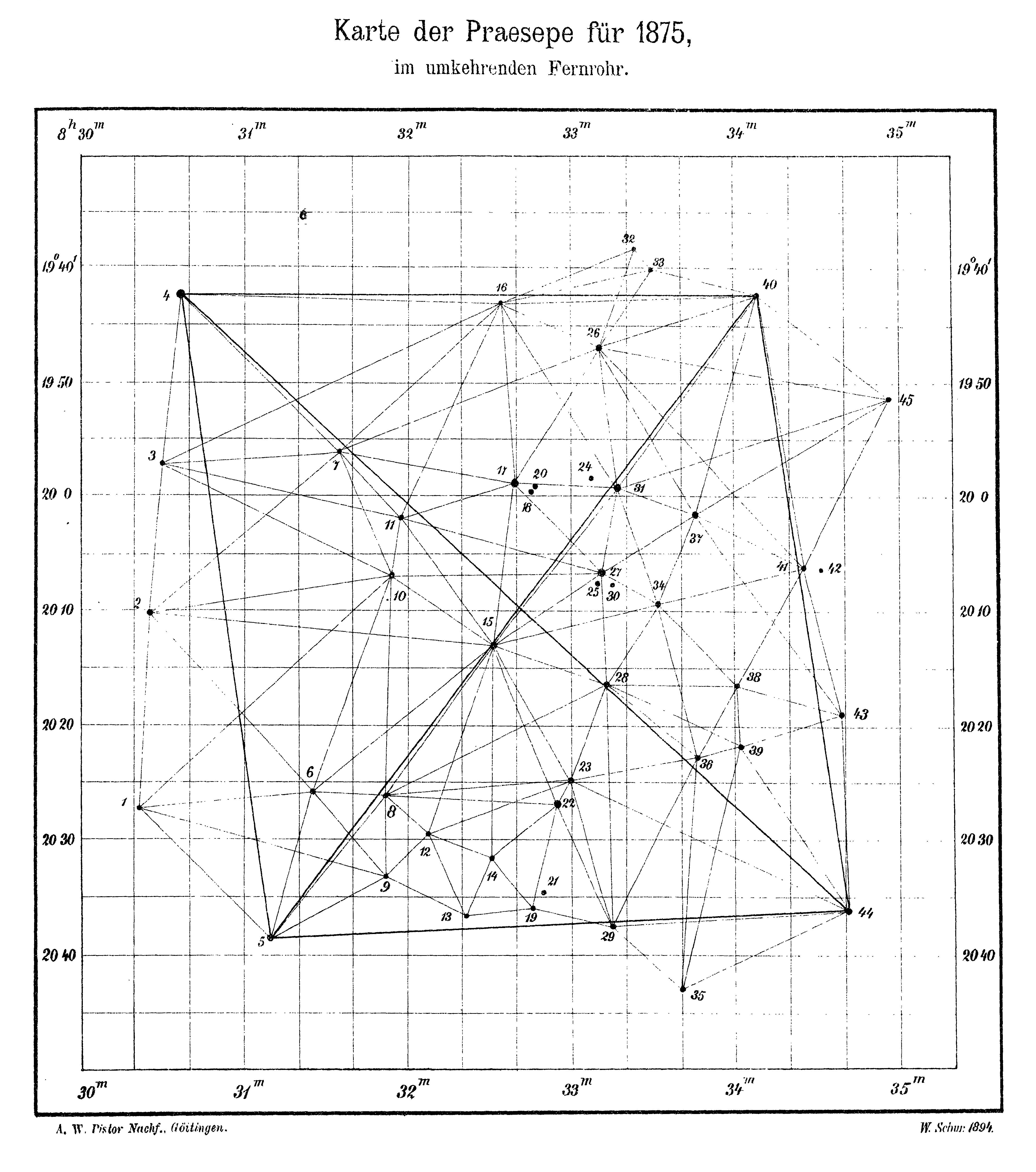
Map of the Beehive Cluster created by Schur in 1894

On Easter 1886 Schur was appointed to the University of Göttingen as Professor of Practical Astronomy and Director of the Göttingen Observatory. Throughout 1887/1888 he led a complete redevelopment of the observatory in which "almost only the walls remained untouched." Major projects included the renewal of the main hall's roof and the replacement of the outdated dome with one manufactured by Grubb in Dublin, Ireland. In contrast to his predecessor, Wilhelm Klinkerfues, Schur was very successful in modernizing the inadequate equipment of the observatory, acquiring a new, large Repsold heliometer in 1888. In the following years Schur devoted all of his time to working with the new instrument. Among his most important works was the triangulation of the Beehive Cluster in 1894 and the two star clusters h Persei and χ Persei, which together form the Double Cluster, between 1891 and 1896. Averaging the results of his Beehive Cluster measurements led to 123 equations with 74 unknowns, which he resolved according to Gauss's method of least squares. The calculations were a tremendous amount of work and thus required 10 weeks to complete.

In addition to his own research, Schur took on a number of other projects, including administrative and historical tasks. Together with an assistant, he catalogued and organised over 11,000 books and brochures in the observatory's library over a period of a year and a half, finishing in 1899 and leaving the library "in an orderly condition for the first time in 44 years." In 1891 he published a star catalogue of 6000 astronomical objects, which his professor and fellow past director of the observatory Wilhelm Klinkerfues had observed from 1858 to 1869. In 1899 he published another catalogue, this time of comets and minor planets observed by Wilhelm Olbers from 1795 to 1831. For the 150th anniversary of the Göttingen Academy of Sciences in 1901 he wrote a historical overview of the development of astronomy in the Kingdom of Hanover and neighbouring areas.

At the beginning of 1901 Schur began exhibiting symptoms of severe stomach cancer and his health began to rapidly deteriorate. He was left housebound and could only partially continue his work. He failed to recover and died in the evening hours of 1 July 1901.

== Personal life ==
=== Family ===
Schur's father was the Altona wine merchant Friedrich Wilhelm Schur (1817 – 1865) and his mother was Johanna Helene Antoinette Thormälen (born 1820). His grandfather on his father's side was the child of Johann Carl Andreas Schur, a Berlin pharmacist who moved to Altona in 1796 and founded a soap factory. In 1832 his grandfather's widow married Adolph Cornelius Petersen, the director of the Altona Observatory and co-editor of the Astronomische Nachrichten journal.

During his time in Strasbourg, Schur met Lucie Thorn (born 1852), the eldest daughter of a general practitioner in Neuwied, whom he married on 29 September 1883. They never had any children.

=== Personality ===
In 1898 Martin Brendel was appointed to the University of Göttingen as Professor of Theoretical Astronomy and Geodesy. In the three years leading to Schur's death, Brendel knew him as an extremely conscientious and lovable colleague, saying:

…waren Schur’s hervorragendste Charaktereigenschaften ein eiserner Fleiss und eine gänzliche Hingabe an die von ihm unternommenen Arbeiten; was er sich einmal vorgenommen hatte, führte er mit unermüdlicher Pflichttreue aus. Für seine Person kannte er keine Schonung; er hielt die zahlreichen von ihm eingerichteten Dienststunden am allerpeinlichsten für sich selbst inne. …Dabei war es für ihn eine Genugthuung, um nicht zu sagen ein Bedürfniss, wenn auch andere um ihn herum mit demselben Eifer thätig waren. Der Unterzeichnete erinnert sich lebhaft, wie schwer es zuweilen war, ihn von seinem Arbeitstisch zu einem Spaziergange loszureissen, dessen er doch zu seiner Erholung dringend bedurfte, namentlich in der Zeit, wo seine Gesundheit schon etwas angegriffen war. So pflichttreu Schur bei seiner stillen Arbeit war, ebenso bescheiden war er auch in seinem äusseren Auftreten. Niemals hat er sich bemüht, irgendwie mit seiner Person hervorzutreten. Wer Gelegenheit hatte, ihn nahe genug kennen zu lernen, der konnte sich überzeugen, dass unter seinem stillen Aeusseren eine seltene Herzensgüte verborgen war. ...Schur's most outstanding traits were an iron diligence and an utter devotion to the work he undertook; what he had set out to do, he pursued with tireless devotion. He knew no mercy for his person; he held most of the many work hours he had set up for himself. ...It was a satisfaction for him, not to say a need, if others were active around him with the same zeal. The undersigned vividly recalls how hard it was at times to pull him off his desk for a walk he urgently needed for his recovery, especially at the time when his health was already somewhat under attack. As dutiful as Schur was in his silent work, he was just as modest in his outward appearance. He has never tried to come out with his person. Anyone who had the opportunity to get to know him close enough could convince himself that a rare kindness of heart was hidden beneath his silent appearance.

==== Relationship with colleagues ====
Schur, like Wilhelm Klinkerfues, suffered due to the division of the Göttingen Observatory into theoretical and practical wings, which caused needless conflict and only ended after 1897. Despite this, he attempted to maintain friendly relations with everyone. In the obituary of Ernst Schering, who was often on the opposing side of the divide, Schur wrote the following:

Ungeachtet mancher durch die Zweitheilung der Sternwarte hervorgerufenen Schwierigkeiten war das Zusammenleben des Verstorbenen und des Unterzeichneten während eines Zeitraumes von mehr als elf Jahren ein durchaus freundschaftliches. Despite some difficulties caused by the division of the observatory, the coexistence of the deceased and undersigned over a period of more than eleven years was quite friendly.

== Honours ==
=== Awards ===
- Damoiseau Prize in 1883 by the French Academy of Sciences;

=== Memberships ===
- Member of the Astronomische Gesellschaft in 1866;
- Member of the German Mathematical Society in 1882;
- Member of the Academy of Sciences Leopoldina in 1885;
- Member of the Göttingen Academy of Sciences in 1893;
- Associate of the Royal Astronomical Society in 1898;

== Memorials ==
=== Obituaries ===
- Ambronn, Leopold (1901). "Todes-Anzeige [von Adolf Christian Wilhelm Schur]" [Display of Death [of Adolf Christian Wilhelm Schur]]. Astronomische Nachrichten (in German). 156: 175–176. Bibcode:1901AN....156..175A. doi:10.1002/asna.19011561109.
- Brendel, Martin (1901). "Nekrolog." [Obituary.]. Vierteljahresschrift der Astronomischen Gesellschaft (in German). 36: 164–170.
- Becker, Ernst (1902). "Wilhelm Schur †. Mitglied der Deutschen Mathematiker-Vereinigung" [Wilhelm Schur †. Member of the German Mathematical Society]. Jahresbericht der Deutschen Mathematiker-Vereinigung (in German). 11: 292–301.

=== Other biographies ===
- Arndt, Karl; Gottschalk, Gerhard; Smend, Rudolf; Slenczka, Ruth (2001). Göttinger Gelehrte: die Akademie der Wissenschaften zu Göttingen in Bildnissen und Würdigungen 1751-2001. Wallstein Verlag. p. 278. ISBN 9783892444855.
- Treichel, Fritz (1985). Biographisches Lexikon für Schleswig-Holstein und Lübeck. Vol. 7. Schleswig-Holsteinische Landesbibliothek. pp. 287–289. ISBN 978-3-529-02647-8.

=== Other ===
- Brandt, Lutz (1995). "Hundert Jahre Praesepe-Vermessung durch Wilhelm Schur in Göttingen". Publications of the Gauss Society. 32: 69–76. Bibcode:1995GGMit..32...69B.

== Publications ==
An extensive list of Schur's publications can be found on the Astrophysics Data System.

=== Notable works ===
- Proctor, Richard A. (1877). Schur, Wilhelm (ed.). Unser Standpunkt im Weltall [Our Place Among Infinities]. Translated by Schur, Wilhelm. Henninger.
- Schur, Wilhelm (1891). Stern-Catalog, enthaltend 6000 Sternörter für 1860.0. nach den von Wilhelm Klinkerfues in den Jahren 1858–1869 angestellten Zonenbeobachtungen.
- Schur, Wilhelm (1899). Neue Reduktion der von Wilhelm Olbers im Zeitraum von 1795 bis 1831 auf seinr Sternwarte in Bremen angestellten Beobachtungen von Kometen und kleinen Planeten.

== See also ==
- Carl Friedrich Gauss, mathematician and physicist who held directorship of the Göttingen Observatory from 1807 to 1855.
- Hermann Krone, photographer who joined Schur on the expedition to observe the 1874 Venus transit.
