= Pr0201 b =

Extrasolar planet in the constellation Cancer

Discovery
- Discovered by: Sam Quinn
- Discovery site: University of Georgia
- Discovery date: 2012
- Detection method: Radial velocity

Orbital characteristics
- Orbital period (sidereal): 4.4264 (± 0.007) d
- Time of periastron: 2,455,992.861
- Star: Pr0201

Physical characteristics
- Mass: 0.54 (± 0.039) M_{J}

Pr0201 b (also written Pr 0201 b) is an exoplanet orbiting around the F-type main-sequence star Pr0201. Pr0201 b along with Pr0211 b are notable for being the first exoplanets discovered in the Beehive Cluster located in the constellation Cancer. Since Pr0201 b has a mass of about half of Jupiter and an orbital period of about 4 days, it is likely a hot Jupiter. Its host star, Pr0201, is rotationally variable and has a rotation period of 5.63 days.

== Discovery ==
Pr0201 b and Pr 0211 b were discovered in 2012 by Sam Quinn and his colleagues while observing 53 stars in the Beehive Cluster using the 1.5 m (4.9 ft; 1.6 yd) telescope at the University of Georgia in the United States.
