= 42 Cancri =

Star in the constellation Cancer

Observation data Epoch J2000 Equinox ICRS
- Constellation: Cancer
- Right ascension: 08^{h} 40^{m} 43.20548^{s}
- Declination: +19° 43′ 09.5322″
- Apparent magnitude (V): 6.83

Characteristics
- Evolutionary stage: main sequence
- Spectral type: A7III
- B−V color index: 0.202±0.004

Astrometry
Radial velocity (R_{v})	+34.6±0.9 km/s
Proper motion (μ)	RA: −35.946±0.032 mas/yr Dec.: −11.854±0.024 mas/yr
Parallax (π)	5.3560±0.0311 mas
Distance	609 ± 4 ly (187 ± 1 pc)
Absolute magnitude (M_{V})	0.56

Details
Mass	2.39±0.03 M_{☉}
Radius	4.22±0.27 R_{☉}
Luminosity	53.8±0.21 L_{☉}
Surface gravity (log g)	3.52±0.07 cgs
Temperature	7,879±134 K
Metallicity [Fe/H]	−0.08±0.03 dex
Rotation	2.06 days
Rotational velocity (v sin i)	195 km/s
Age	603±28 Myr

Other designations
- 42 Cnc, BD+20°2172, GC 11916, HD 73785, HIP 42578, SAO 98030, PPM 125583

Database references
SIMBAD	data

42 Cancri is a single star in the northern zodiac constellation of Cancer. With an apparent visual magnitude of 6.83, it is dimmer than what is considered the normal lower limit for visibility with the naked eye. The star is located at a distance of approximately 616 light years from the Sun based on parallax, and is drifting further away with a radial velocity of +35 km/s. 42 Cancri is a member of the Beehive Cluster (NGC 2632).

The stellar classification of this star is A7III, matching an A-type star that is in the giant stage. However, this may be a misclassification of a main sequence star. It has also been classified as a spectroscopic binary, although no orbital elements are published. 42 Cancri is an estimated 603 million years old and is spinning rapidly with a projected rotational velocity of 195 km/s. The star has 2.39 times the mass of the Sun and 4.2 times the Sun's radius. It is radiating 54 times the luminosity of the Sun from its photosphere at an effective temperature of 7,879 K.
