= C/1854 L1 (Klinkerfues) =

Non-periodic comet

Discovery
- Discovered by: Wilhelm Klinkerfues
- Discovery date: 6 June 1854

Designations
- Alternative designations: 1854 III

Orbital characteristics
- Epoch: 22 May 1854 (JD 2398360.5)
- Observation arc: 54 days
- Number of observations: 262
- Perihelion: 0.648 AU
- Semi-major axis: ~480 AU
- Eccentricity: 0.99866
- Orbital period: ~10,600 years
- Inclination: 131.69°
- Longitude of ascending node: 346.88°
- Argument of periapsis: 344.95°
- Mean anomaly: 359.20°
- Last perihelion: 22 June 1854

Physical characteristics
- Mean diameter: ~4.8 km (3.0 mi)
- Comet total magnitude (M1): 6.4
- Apparent magnitude: 4.0 (1854 apparition)

C/1854 L1 (Klinkerfues) is a non-periodic comet that became barely visible to the naked eye between June and July 1854. It is the second of six comets discovered by the German astronomer, Wilhelm Klinkerfues.

== Orbit ==
Initial orbital calculations by Friedrich Winnecke in 1855 resulted in a parabolic trajectory for the comet. Several attempts to compute an elliptical orbit were conducted since then, including by Klinkerfues himself where he noted that the orbit of C/1854 L1 is similar to those of the comets that appeared in 961 (C/962 B2) and 1558 (C/1558 P1) respectively. The possibility that C/1854 L1 is related to the comet of 961 AD was further explored in 1981, where it was tentatively assigned as the parent body of the ε-Eridanid meteor stream. This resulted in a Halley-type orbital period of approximately 127 years, however further calculations by Jeremie Vaubaillon and Peter Jenniskens ruled out a link between the two comets, as the simulated dust generated did not match those observed in the aforementioned 1981 meteor shower.

A more definitive orbit was calculated by Richard L. Branham, Jr. in 2013, where he concluded that the comet has a highly-elliptical orbit that is completed once every 10,600 years and thus presents no immediate threat to Earth.
