= Epsilon Cancri =

Binary star system in the constellation Cancer

ε Cancri
- Location of ε Cancri (circled red)

Observation data Epoch J2000 Equinox ICRS
- Constellation: Cancer
- ε Cnc A
- Right ascension: 08^{h} 40^{m} 27.01010^{s}
- Declination: +19° 32′ 41.3243″
- Apparent magnitude (V): 6.29
- HD 73711
- Right ascension: 08^{h} 40^{m} 18.09670^{s}
- Declination: +19° 31′ 55.1636″
- Apparent magnitude (V): 7.535

Characteristics

ε Cnc A
- Spectral type: A5 III (kA3hA5mF0)
- U−B color index: +0.16
- B−V color index: +0.17

B (HD 73711)
- Evolutionary stage: main sequence
- Spectral type: F0III (kA3hA5mF0)

Astrometry

ε Cnc A
Radial velocity (R_{v})	+29.9±1.1 km/s
Proper motion (μ)	RA: −36.293 mas/yr Dec.: −12.133 mas/yr
Parallax (π)	5.3836±0.0474 mas
Distance	606 ± 5 ly (186 ± 2 pc)
Absolute magnitude (M_{V})	+0.00

B (HD 73711)
Proper motion (μ)	RA: −36.251 mas/yr Dec.: −12.118 mas/yr
Parallax (π)	5.4103±0.0308 mas
Distance	603 ± 3 ly (185 ± 1 pc)

Orbit
Primary	ε Cnc Aa
Secondary	ε Cnc Ab
Period (P)	35.14101±0.00005 d
Semi-major axis (a)	1.9127±0.0004 mas
Eccentricity (e)	0.4195±0.0003
Inclination (i)	81.454±0.010°
Longitude of the node (Ω)	356.069±0.014°
Periastron epoch (T)	2448314.598±0.016
Argument of periastron (ω) (primary)	258.38±0.02°
Semi-amplitude (K_{1}) (primary)	56.60±0.03 km/s
Semi-amplitude (K_{2}) (secondary)	61.55±0.10 km/s

Details

ε Cnc Aa
Mass	2.420±0.008 M_{☉}
Radius	~3.8 (Note: Calculated using distance of 183.1 parsecs and estimated angular diameter of 0.000194 arcseconds (0.194 mas). 183.1 • 0.000194 • 107.5 = 3.8 R_{☉}) R_{☉}
Luminosity	~59.8 L_{☉}
Surface gravity (log g)	~3.6 cgs
Temperature	~8,060 K
Metallicity [Fe/H]	~ +0.2 dex
Age	637±19 Myr

ε Cnc Ab
Mass	2.226±0.004 M_{☉}
Radius	~2.7 (Note: Calculated using distance of 183.1 parsecs and estimated angular diameter of 0.000136 arcseconds (0.136 mas). 183.1 • 0.000136 • 107.5 = 2.7 R_{☉}) R_{☉}
Surface gravity (log g)	~4.0 cgs
Temperature	~8,330 K
Metallicity [Fe/H]	~ +0.2 dex
Age	637±19 Myr

B (HD 73711)
Mass	2.02 M_{☉}
Radius	2.65 R_{☉}
Luminosity	29 L_{☉}
Surface gravity (log g)	3.90 cgs
Temperature	8,236 K
Metallicity [Fe/H]	+0.79 dex
Rotational velocity (v sin i)	56.3 km/s
Age	346 Myr

Other designations
- CCDM J08404+1932, WDS J08405+1933
- ε Cancri: Meleph, ε Cnc, 41 Cancri, BD+20°2171, GC 11904, HD 73731, HIP 42556, HR 3429, SAO 98024, GSC 01395-02733
- B: BD+20°2163, GC 11893, HD 73711, SAO 98018

Database references
SIMBAD	ε Cancri
- B (HD 73711)

Epsilon Cancri is a white-hued multiple star system in the zodiac constellation of Cancer. Its name is a Bayer designation that is Latinized from ε Cancri, and abbreviated Epsilon Cnc or ε Cnc. This is the brightest member of the Beehive Cluster (or Praesepe) with an apparent visual magnitude of +6.29, which is near the lower limit of visibility with the naked eye. The annual parallax shift of 5.4 mas as seen from Earth yields a distance estimate of approximately 606 light-years (186 pc) from the Sun. The system is moving away from the Sun with a radial velocity of +30 km/s.

The outer pair has the designation WDS J08405+1933. The primary star is designated Epsilon Cancri and the secondary is HD 73711. Epsilon Cancri is itself a spectroscopic binary with components designated Aa (also named Meleph) and Ab. HD 73711 is also suspected of being a spectroscopic binary.

== Nomenclature ==
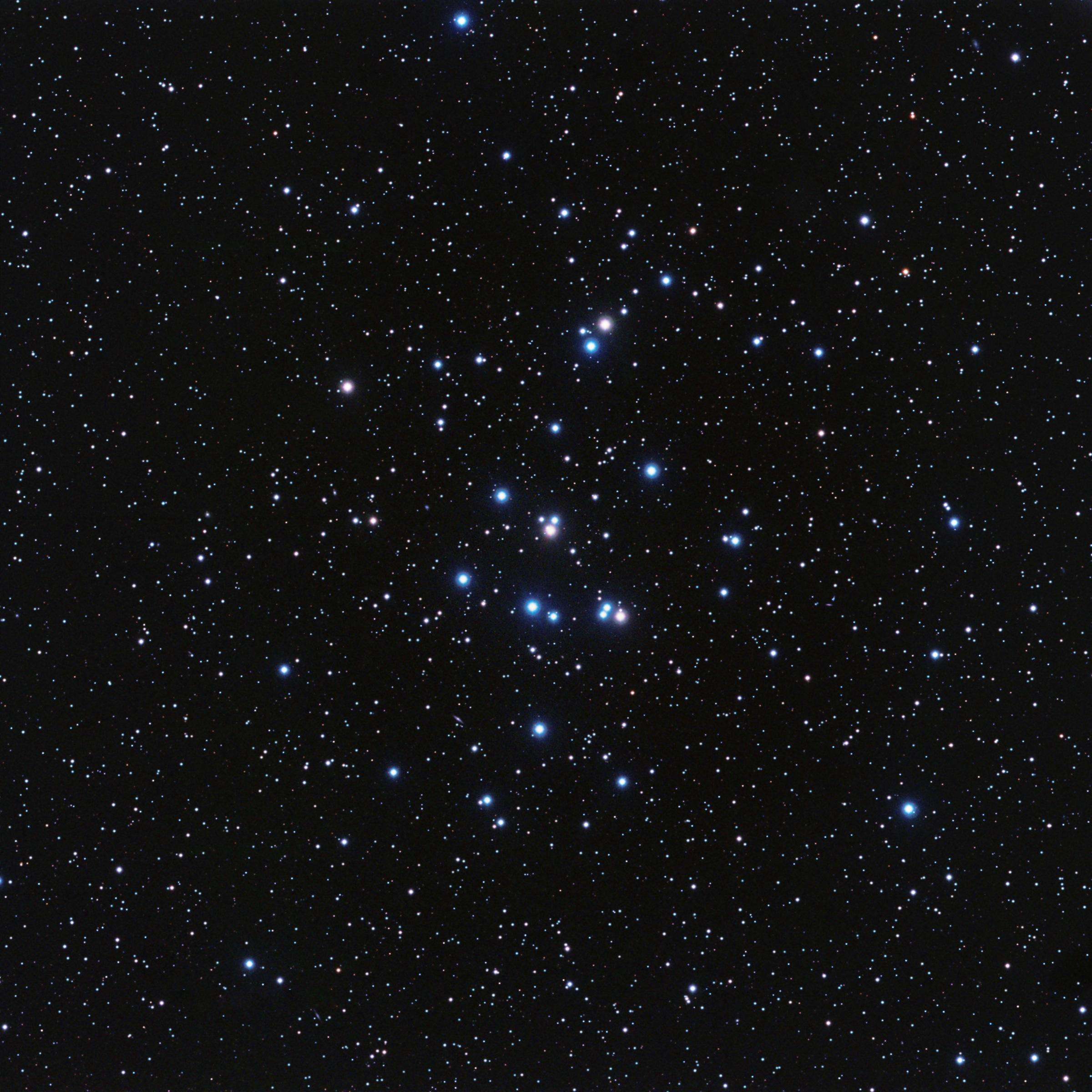
Praesepe. ε Cancri is the brightest blue star, near the centre of the image.

ε Cancri (Latinised to Epsilon Cancri) is the system's Bayer designation, which originally referred to the entire Beehive Cluster. In his Uranometria, Bayer cited (among others) the name Melleff or Meeleph for the cluster, from Arabic Al Ma'laf, the Stall; as Meleph, this name is also now applied specifically to this star.

In 2016, the IAU organized a Working Group on Star Names (WGSN) to catalog and standardize proper names for stars. The WGSN decided to attribute proper names to individual stars rather than entire multiple systems. It approved the name Meleph for the component Epsilon Cancri Aa on 5 September 2017 and it is now so included in the List of IAU-approved Star Names.

== Properties ==
Epsilon Cancri A is a double-lined spectroscopic binary system with an orbital period of 35.14 days and eccentricity of 0.42. It has a stellar classification of A5 III, which matches an A-type giant star. The spectrum displays the chemically peculiar characteristics of an Am star. Its spectral type has been listed as kA3hA5mF0, indicating the different spectral types shown by spectral lines of calcium, hydrogen, and other metals. Despite the spectral classification, evolutionary models suggest that the star is still on the main sequence, although at the very end of its hydrogen-burning life. The age of the system is estimated to be around 637 million years.

HD 73711 is another Am star, given a stellar classification of F0 III on the basis of its hydrogen absorption lines but a more complete classification of kA3hA5mF0. Although the spectral class would indicate that the star is a giant, models suggest that it is still fusing hydrogen in its core and so is till on the main sequence.
