= Wilhelm Klinkerfues =

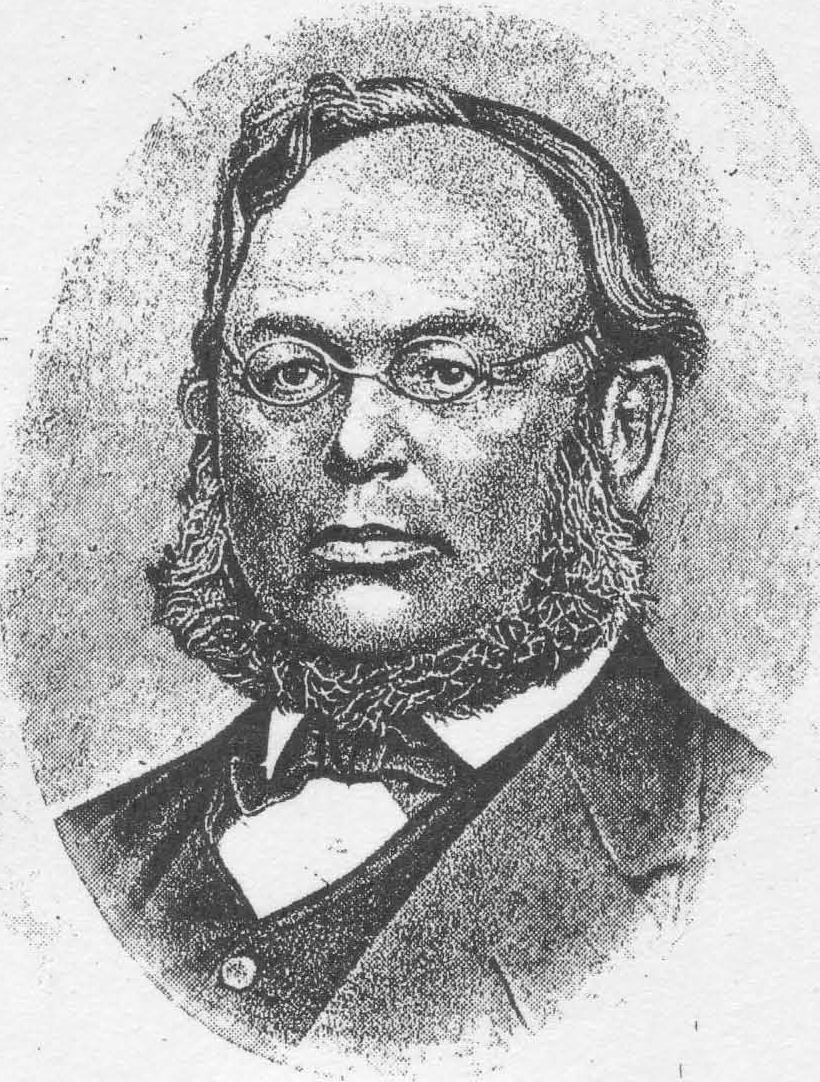
- Wilhelm Klinkerfues in 1884
- Born: Ernst Friedrich Wilhelm Klinkerfues; 29 March 1827; Hofgeismar, Hesse, Germany
- Died: 28 January 1884 (aged 56); Göttingen, Lower Saxony, Germany
- Scientific career
- Fields: Astronomy
- Doctoral students: Wilhelm Schur

Ernst Friedrich Wilhelm Klinkerfues (29 March 1827 in Hofgeismar – 28 January 1884 in Göttingen) was a German astronomer and meteorologist. He discovered six comets and published weather reports of varying accuracy based on his meteorological measurements.

== Early life ==
Klinkerfues was born in Hofgeismar, the son of army doctor Johann Reinhard Klinkerfues and his wife Sabine (née Dedolph). After the early death of his parents, he was brought up by relatives, and after attending high school qualified as a surveyor in Kassel. In this capacity he subsequently worked on the new Frankfurt - Kassel railway.

From 1847 to 1851 Klinkerfues studied mathematics and astronomy at the University of Marburg. He then became an assistant to Carl Friedrich Gauss at Göttingen Observatory, where he completed his Ph.D. with a thesis on orbit calculations of double stars. After Gauss's death in 1855, the mathematician W. E. Weber replaced him as director, but Klinkerfues was to be temporarily responsible for the observatory from 1861.

== Career ==
Klinkerfues discovered 6 comets, and in 1860 led an expedition to Spain to observe a solar eclipse. He was finally appointed "director for practical astronomy" at Göttingen in 1868. However, the role of Klinkerfues's section of the observatory was solely to deal with practical work, the theoretical work being placed in the hands of Ernst Schering. Klinkerfues was, like his predecessor, allowed to live in the eastern wing of the observatory, but the division of the observatory's organisation between the two teams was to be a source of constant conflict.

In his 1871 book Theoretische Astronomie Klinkerfues described how the orbits of celestial bodies in the Solar System could be calculated. In the same period he compiled a catalogue of around 6900 observed stars.

Klinkerfues also had an abiding interest in meteorology, developing a hygrometer, patented in 1877, that was later manufactured in Göttingen by Wilhelm Lambrecht. His weather forecasts, published in newspapers, proved to be often incorrect, which led to them cruelly parodying his last name as "Flunkerkies". Undeterred by this criticism, he published a book on the hygrometer's use in 1875, and developed a detonator for use in Göttingen's gas street lighting. He also continued to supervise doctoral students, one of whom was Hermann Kobold.

Klinkerfues was plagued by debt for much of his life, exacerbated by ill-advised business ventures. He attempted to persevere with his astronomical work, in the course of which, as his obituary in the Monthly Notices of the Royal Astronomical Society noted, he published many papers that were "singularly readable, and often contained the most original and suggestive ideas. Occasionally, indeed, they were altogether of a quaintly humorous character, introducing, for instance, the alleged wonderful discoveries of an imaginary Professor Monkhouse". Nevertheless, he continued to encounter problems with professional advancement:

"It would be useless and almost impossible to attempt to describe how the warm-hearted and genial astronomer failed to take that position amongst his colleagues to which his undoubtedly great natural talents entitled him. His extreme carelessness in late years in his outward appearances was certainly much against him, but the unflagging zeal with which he delivered a whole course of lectures, if need were, even to a single student, ought to have told in his favour, as to some extent it doubtless did."

In 1881 he published Tobias Mayer's grössere Mondkarte nebst Detailzeichnungen, a large Moon map and set of drawings by Tobias Mayer that had gathered dust in the observatory library for 130 years.

== Death ==
He shot himself on 28 January 1884.

== Honors ==
The asteroid 112328 Klinkerfues is named in his honour, as were 6 non-periodic comets:

- C/1853 L1 (a.k.a. 1853 III)
- C/1854 L1 (a.k.a. 1854 III)
- C/1854 R1 (a.k.a. 1854 IV)
- C/1857 M1 (a.k.a. 1857 III)
- C/1857 Q1 (a.k.a. 1857 V)
- C/1863 G1 (a.k.a. 1863 II)

== Works ==
- Theoretische Astronomie, 1871, 1899,
- Theorie des Bifilar-Hygrometers, 1875
- Prinzipien der Spektralanalyse, 1879

== Sources ==
- Siegmund Günther: Klinkerfues, Wilhelm. In: Allgemeine Deutsche Biographie (ADB). Bd. 51, Duncker & Humblot, Leipzig 1906, S. 231–233.
- H. Michling: Im Schatten des Titanen – das tragische Leben des Astronomen Klinkerfues. Teile I bis IV. Göttinger Monatsblätter, März–Juni 1975
