= Open cluster family =

In astronomy, an open cluster family is a group of approximately coeval (age range $\sim$30 Myr) young open star clusters located in a relatively small region of the Galactic disk (radius $\sim$250 pc).

== Introduction ==
Open clusters do not form in isolation but in complexes (Efremov 1978), within star forming regions. When age, spatial distribution, and kinematics are taken into account simultaneously, a significant number of known young open clusters are found in groups.

Piskunov et al. (2006) found evidence for four open cluster complexes (OCCs) of different ages containing up to a few tens of clusters. The existence of at least five dynamical families of young open clusters in the Milky Way disk has been confirmed using statistical analysis by de la Fuente Marcos and de la Fuente Marcos (2008). They are, in order of increasing distance: Orion, Scutum-Sagittarius, Cygnus, Scorpius, and Cassiopeia-Perseus. These families are associated to the Galactic spiral structure, they are short-lived as they disperse in a relatively short timescale and they are progenitors of classical superclusters, moving groups, and stellar streams (de la Fuente Marcos & de la Fuente Marcos 2008).

The Cassiopeia-Perseus open cluster family is located 2 kpc from the Sun between the constellations of Cassiopeia and Perseus, embedded in the Perseus spiral arm (de la Fuente Marcos & de la Fuente Marcos 2009). The structure roughly defines a plane that is inclined almost 30° with respect to the plane of the Milky Way. It has a diameter of about 600 pc and includes 10 to 20 members. Most candidate members are located below the galactic disk and moving away from it. It started to form about 20 to 40 Myr (1 Myr = 10^{6} yr) ago.

== See also ==
- Stellar association
- Moving groups
- Open cluster
- Open cluster remnant
- Star cluster
