= Open cluster =

Type of star cluster

- The Pleiades is among the nearest open clusters to Earth

Characteristics
- Type: Loose cluster of stars
- Size range: < 30 ly in diameter
- Density: ~ 1.5 stars / cubic ly

External links
- Media category
- Q11387

Additional Information

An open cluster is a type of star cluster made of tens to a few thousand stars that were formed from the same giant molecular cloud and have roughly the same age. More than 1,100 open clusters have been discovered within the Milky Way galaxy, and many more are thought to exist. Each one is loosely bound by mutual gravitational attraction and becomes disrupted by close encounters with other clusters and clouds of gas as they orbit the Galactic Center. This can result in a loss of cluster members through internal close encounters and a dispersion into the main body of the galaxy. Open clusters generally survive for a few hundred million years, with the most massive ones surviving for a few billion years. In contrast, the more massive globular clusters of stars exert a stronger gravitational attraction on their members, and can survive for longer. Open clusters have been found only in spiral and irregular galaxies, in which active star formation is occurring.

Young open clusters may be contained within the molecular cloud from which they formed, illuminating it to create an H II region. Over time, radiation pressure from the cluster will disperse the molecular cloud. Typically, about 10% of the mass of a gas cloud will coalesce into stars before radiation pressure drives the rest of the gas away.

Open clusters are key objects in the study of stellar evolution. Because the cluster members are of similar age and chemical composition, their properties (such as distance, age, metallicity, extinction, and velocity) are more easily determined than they are for isolated stars. A number of open clusters, such as the Pleiades, the Hyades and the Alpha Persei Cluster, are visible with the naked eye. Some others, such as the Double Cluster, are barely perceptible without instruments, while many more can be seen using binoculars or telescopes. The Wild Duck Cluster, M11, is an example.

== Historical observations ==
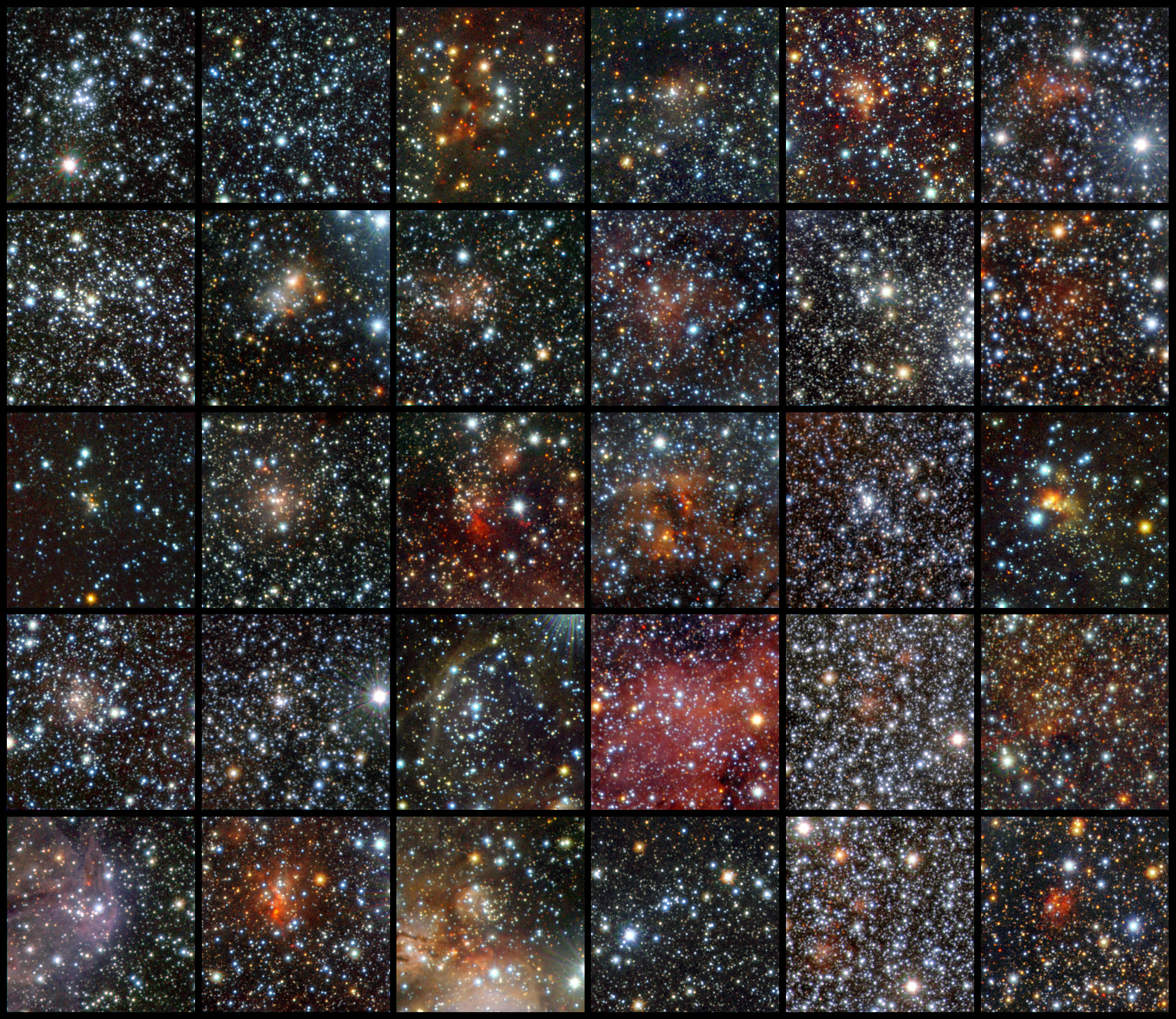
Mosaic of 30 open clusters discovered from VISTA's data. The open clusters were hidden by the dust in the Milky Way. Credit ESO.

The prominent open cluster the Pleiades, in the constellation Taurus, has been recognized as a group of stars since antiquity, while the Hyades (which also form part of Taurus) is one of the oldest open clusters. Other open clusters were noted by early astronomers as unresolved fuzzy patches of light. In his Almagest, the Roman astronomer Ptolemy mentions the Praesepe Cluster, the Double Cluster in Perseus, the Coma Star Cluster and the Ptolemy Cluster, while the Persian astronomer Al-Sufi wrote of the Omicron Velorum cluster. However, it would require the invention of the telescope to resolve these "nebulae" into their constituent stars. Indeed, in 1603 Johann Bayer gave three of these clusters designations as if they were single stars.

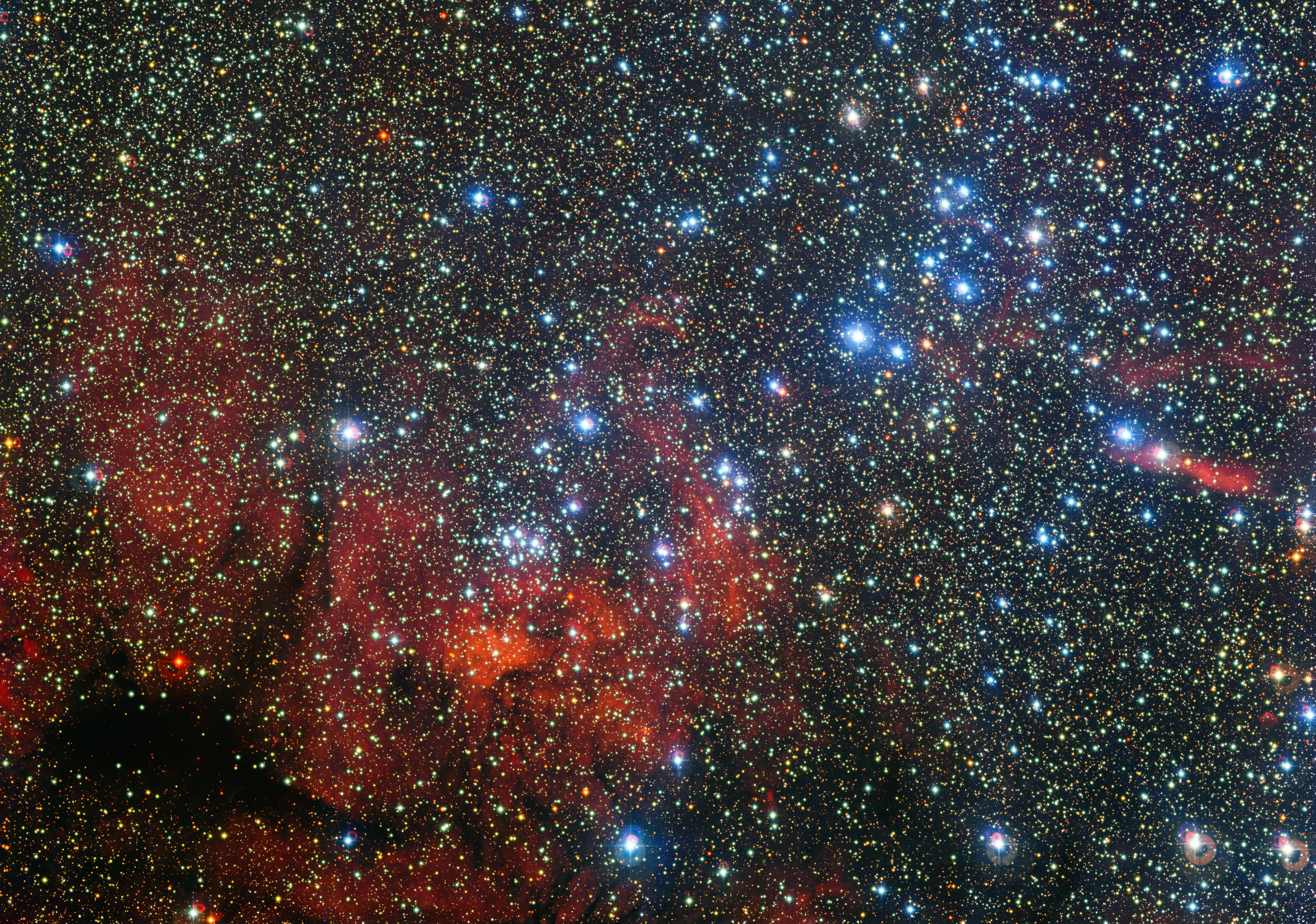
The star cluster NGC 3590

The first person to use a telescope to observe the night sky and record his observations was the Italian scientist Galileo Galilei in 1609. When he turned the telescope toward some of the nebulous patches recorded by Ptolemy, he found they were not a single star, but groupings of many stars. For Praesepe, he found more than 40 stars. Where previously observers had noted only 6–7 stars in the Pleiades, he found almost 50. In his 1610 treatise Sidereus Nuncius, Galileo Galilei wrote, "the galaxy is nothing else but a mass of innumerable stars planted together in clusters." Influenced by Galileo's work, the Sicilian astronomer Giovanni Hodierna became possibly the first astronomer to use a telescope to find previously undiscovered open clusters. In 1654, he identified the objects now designated Messier 41, Messier 47, NGC 2362 and NGC 2451.

It was realized as early as 1767 that the stars in a cluster were physically related, when English naturalist Reverend John Michell calculated that the probability of even just one group of stars like the Pleiades being the result of a chance alignment as seen from Earth was just 1 in 496,000. Between 1774 and 1781, French astronomer Charles Messier published a catalogue of celestial objects that had a nebulous appearance similar to comets. This catalogue included 26 open clusters. In the 1790s, English astronomer William Herschel began an extensive study of nebulous celestial objects. He discovered that many of these features could be resolved into groupings of individual stars. Herschel conceived the idea that stars were initially scattered across space, but later became clustered together as star systems because of gravitational attraction. He divided the nebulae into eight classes, with classes VI through VIII being used to classify clusters of stars.

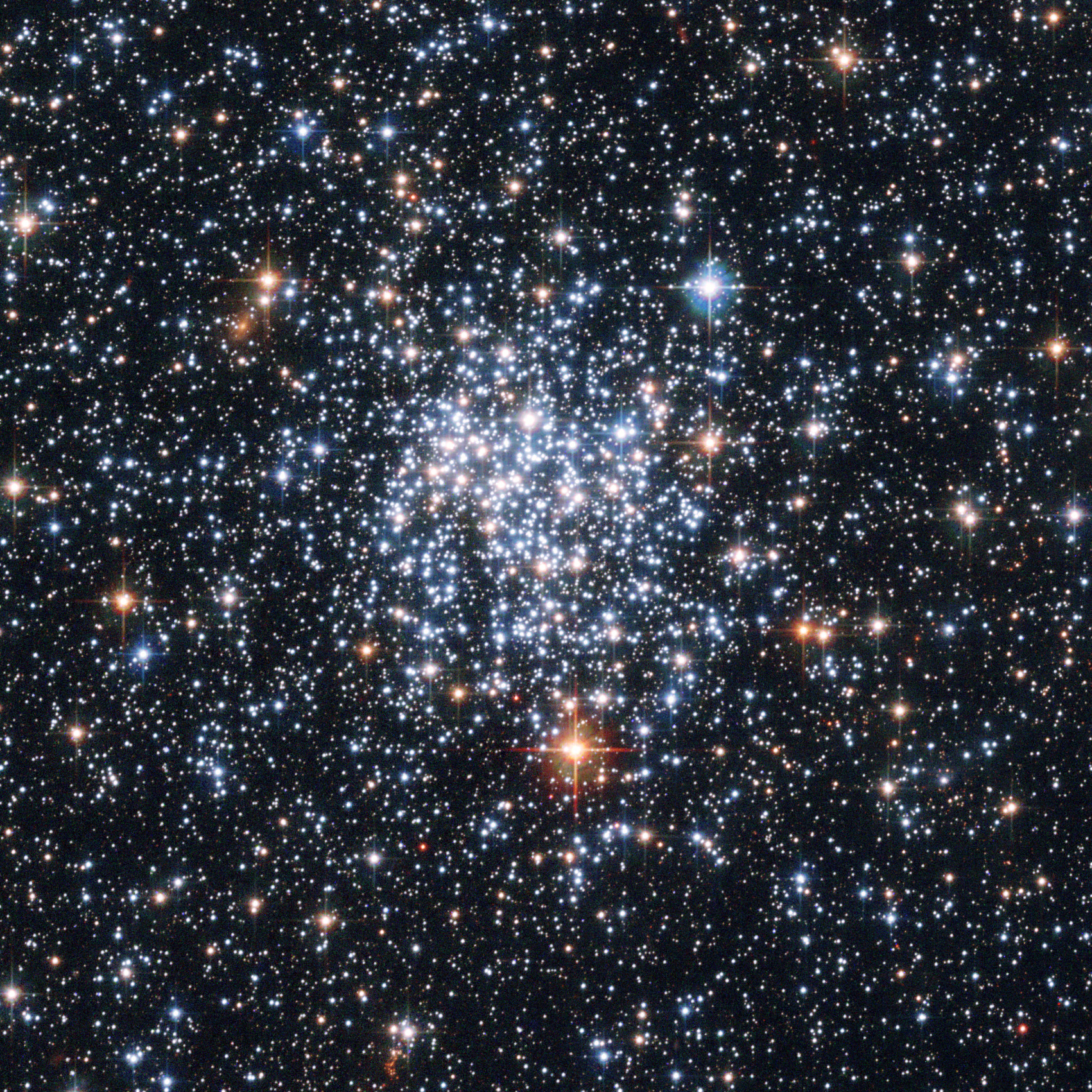
NGC 265, an open star cluster in the Small Magellanic Cloud

The number of clusters known continued to increase under the efforts of astronomers. Hundreds of open clusters were listed in the New General Catalogue, first published in 1888 by the Danish–Irish astronomer J. L. E. Dreyer, and the two supplemental Index Catalogues, published in 1896 and 1905. Telescopic observations revealed two distinct types of clusters, one of which contained thousands of stars in a regular spherical distribution and was found all across the sky but preferentially towards the center of the Milky Way. The other type consisted of a generally sparser population of stars in a more irregular shape. These were generally found in or near the galactic plane of the Milky Way. Astronomers dubbed the former globular clusters, and the latter open clusters. Because of their location, open clusters are occasionally referred to as galactic clusters, a term that was introduced in 1925 by the Swiss-American astronomer Robert Julius Trumpler.

Micrometer measurements of the positions of stars in clusters were made as early as 1877 by the German astronomer E. Schönfeld and further pursued by the American astronomer E. E. Barnard prior to his death in 1923. No indication of stellar motion was detected by these efforts. However, in 1918 the Dutch–American astronomer Adriaan van Maanen was able to measure the proper motion of stars in part of the Pleiades cluster by comparing photographic plates taken at different times. As astrometry became more accurate, cluster stars were found to share a common proper motion through space. By comparing the photographic plates of the Pleiades cluster taken in 1918 with images taken in 1943, van Maanen was able to identify those stars that had a proper motion similar to the mean motion of the cluster, and were therefore more likely to be members. Spectroscopic measurements revealed common radial velocities, thus showing that the clusters consist of stars bound together as a group.

The first color–magnitude diagrams of open clusters were published by Ejnar Hertzsprung in 1911, giving the plot for the Pleiades and Hyades star clusters. He continued this work on open clusters for the next twenty years. From spectroscopic data, he was able to determine the upper limit of internal motions for open clusters, and could estimate that the total mass of these objects did not exceed several hundred times the mass of the Sun. He demonstrated a relationship between the star colors and their magnitudes, and in 1929 noticed that the Hyades and Praesepe clusters had different stellar populations than the Pleiades. This would subsequently be interpreted as a difference in ages of the three clusters.

== Formation ==
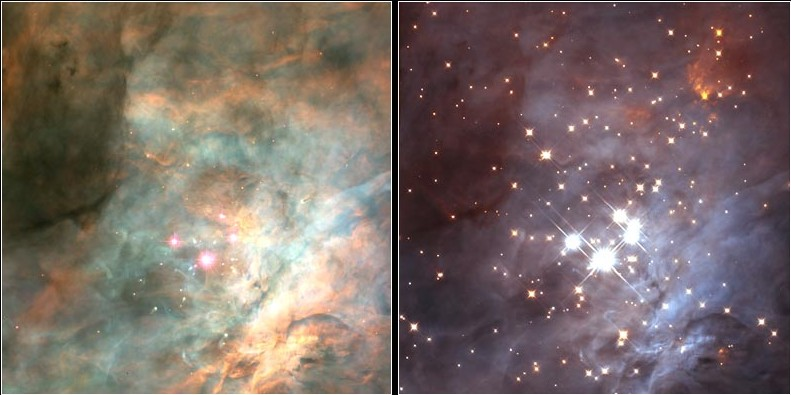
Infrared light reveals the dense open cluster forming at the heart of the Orion Nebula.

The formation of an open cluster begins with the collapse of part of a giant molecular cloud, a cold dense cloud of gas and dust containing up to many thousands of times the mass of the Sun. These clouds have densities that vary from 10^{2} to 10^{6} molecules of neutral hydrogen per cm^{3}, with star formation occurring in regions with densities above 10^{4} molecules per cm^{3}. Typically, only 1–10% of the cloud by volume is above the latter density. Prior to collapse, these clouds maintain their mechanical equilibrium through magnetic fields, turbulence and rotation.

Many factors may disrupt the equilibrium of a giant molecular cloud, triggering a collapse and initiating the burst of star formation that can result in an open cluster. These include shock waves from a nearby supernova, collisions with other clouds and gravitational interactions. Even without external triggers, regions of the cloud can reach conditions where they become unstable against collapse. The collapsing cloud region will undergo hierarchical fragmentation into ever smaller clumps, including a particularly dense form known as infrared dark clouds, eventually leading to the formation of up to several thousand stars. This star formation begins enshrouded in the collapsing cloud, blocking the protostars from sight but allowing infrared observation. In the Milky Way galaxy, the formation rate of open clusters is estimated to be one every few thousand years.

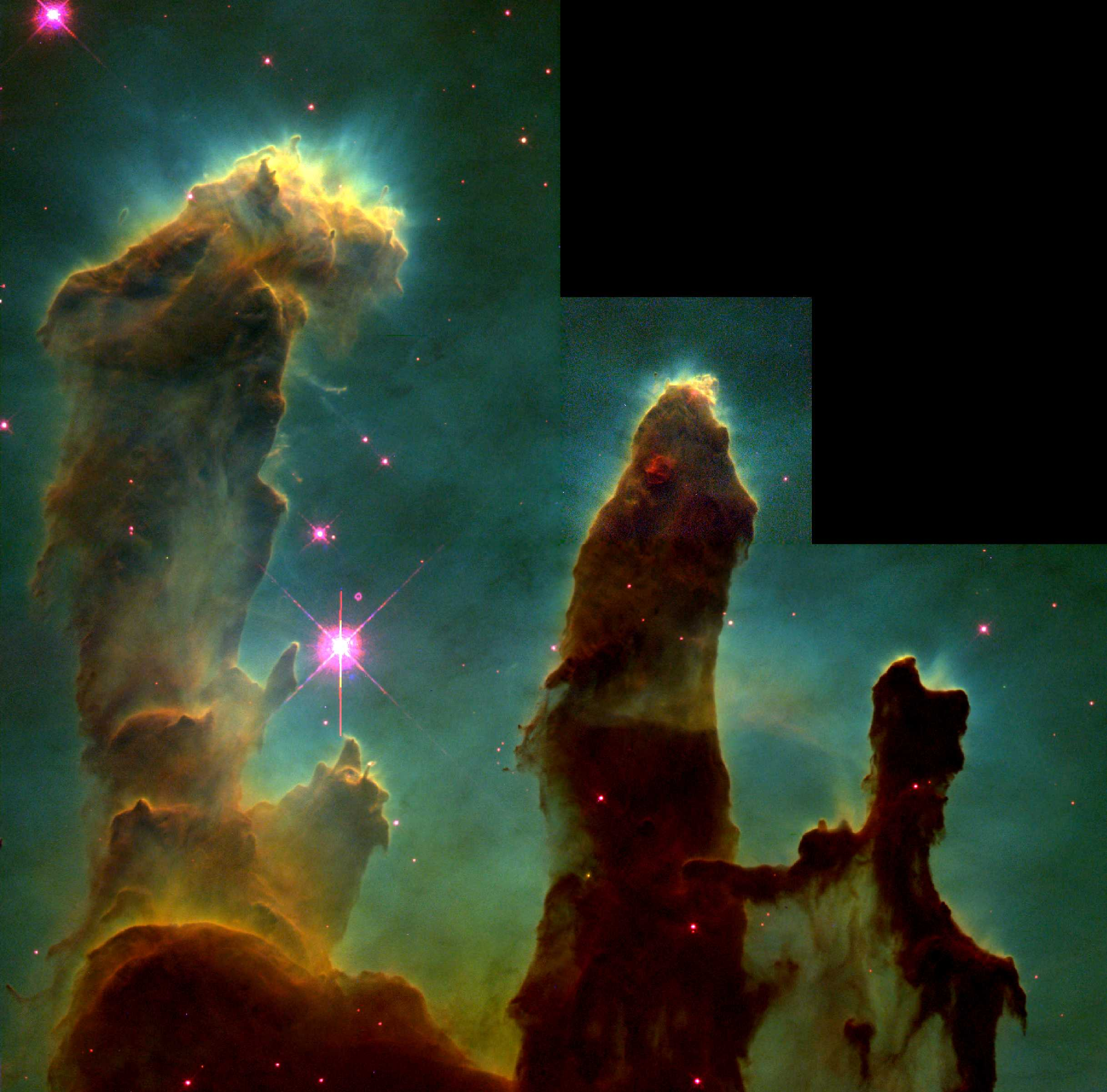
The so-called "Pillars of Creation", a region of the Eagle Nebula where the molecular cloud is being evaporated by young, massive stars

The hottest and most massive of the newly formed stars (known as OB stars) will emit intense ultraviolet radiation, which steadily ionizes the surrounding gas of the giant molecular cloud, forming an H II region. Stellar winds and radiation pressure from the massive stars begins to drive away the hot ionized gas at a velocity matching the speed of sound in the gas. After a few million years the cluster will experience its first core-collapse supernovae, which will also expel gas from the vicinity. In most cases these processes will strip the cluster of gas within ten million years, and no further star formation will take place. Still, about half of the resulting protostellar objects will be left surrounded by circumstellar disks, many of which form accretion disks.

As only 30 to 40 percent of the gas in the cloud core forms stars, the process of residual gas expulsion is highly damaging to the star formation process. All clusters thus suffer significant infant weight loss, while a large fraction undergo infant mortality. At this point, the formation of an open cluster will depend on whether the newly formed stars are gravitationally bound to each other; otherwise an unbound stellar association will result. Even when a cluster such as the Pleiades does form, it may hold on to only a third of the original stars, with the remainder becoming unbound once the gas is expelled. The young stars so released from their natal cluster become part of the Galactic field population.

Because most if not all stars form in clusters, star clusters are to be viewed as the fundamental building blocks of galaxies. The violent gas-expulsion events that shape and destroy many star clusters at birth leave their imprint in the morphological and kinematical structures of galaxies. Most open clusters form with at least 100 stars and a mass of 50 or more solar masses. The largest clusters can have over 10^{4} M_{☉}, with the massive cluster Westerlund 1 being estimated at 5×10^{4} M_{☉} and R136 at almost 5×10^{5} M_{☉}, typical of globular clusters. While open clusters and globular clusters form two fairly distinct groups, there may not be a great deal of intrinsic difference between a very sparse globular cluster such as Palomar 12 and a very rich open cluster. Some astronomers believe the two types of star clusters form via the same basic mechanism, with the difference being that the conditions that allowed the formation of the very rich globular clusters containing hundreds of thousands of stars no longer prevail in the Milky Way.

It is common for two or more separate open clusters to form out of the same molecular cloud. In the Large Magellanic Cloud, both Hodge 301 and R136 have formed from the gases of the Tarantula Nebula, while in our own galaxy, tracing back the motion through space of the Hyades and Praesepe, two prominent nearby open clusters, suggests that they formed in the same cloud about 600 million years ago. Sometimes, two clusters born at the same time will form a binary cluster. The best known example in the Milky Way is the Double Cluster of NGC 869 and NGC 884 (also known as h and χ Persei), but at least 10 more double clusters are known to exist. New research indicates the Cepheid-hosting M25 may constitute a ternary star cluster together with NGC 6716 and Collinder 394. Many more binary clusters are known in the Small and Large Magellanic Clouds—they are easier to detect in external systems than in our own galaxy because projection effects can cause unrelated clusters within the Milky Way to appear close to each other.

== Morphology and classification ==
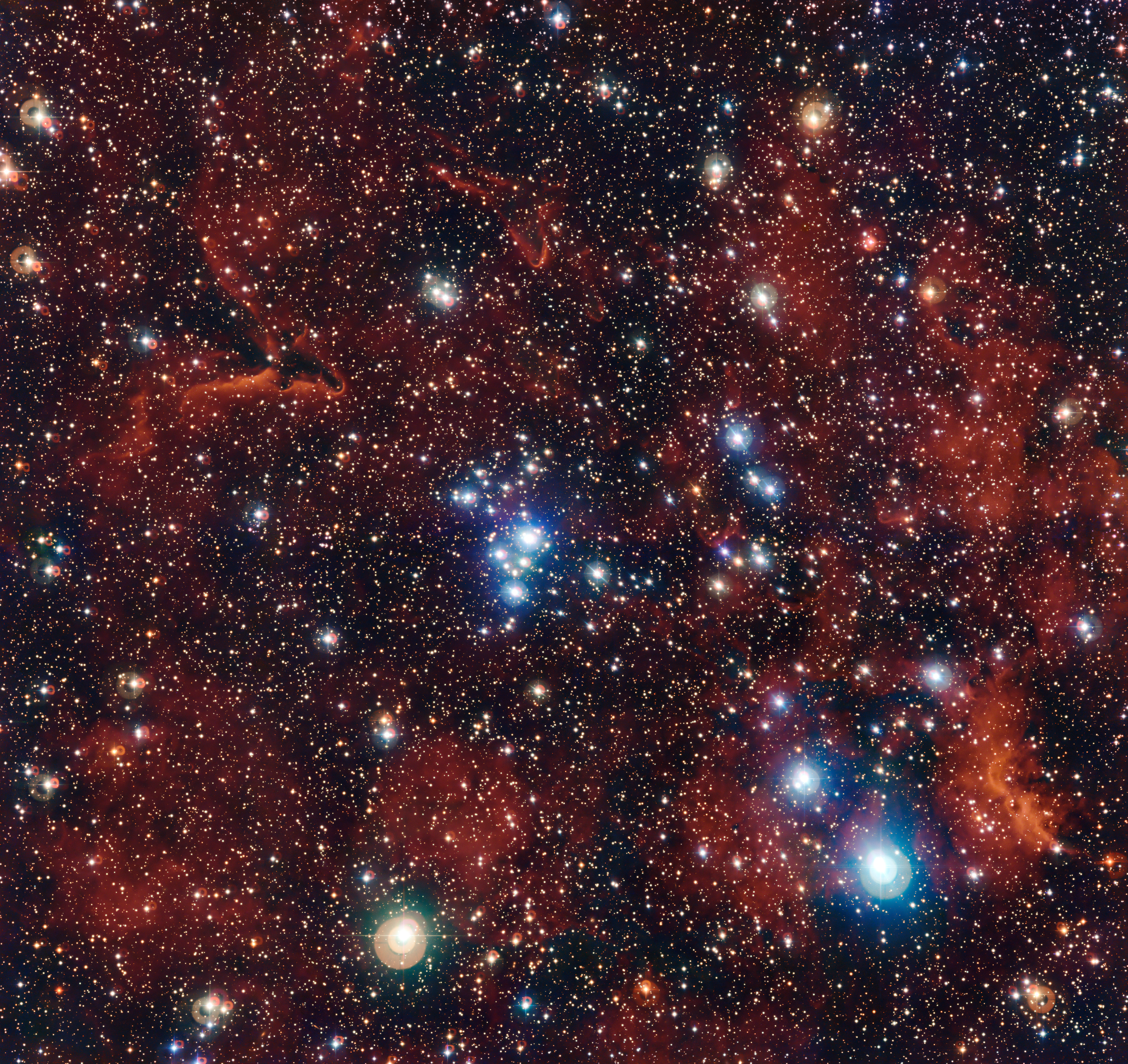
NGC 2367 is an infant stellar grouping that lies at the center of an immense and ancient structure on the margins of the Milky Way.

Open clusters range from very sparse clusters with only a few members to large agglomerations containing thousands of stars. They usually consist of quite a distinct dense core, surrounded by a more diffuse 'corona' of cluster members. The core is typically about 3–4 light years across, with the corona extending to about 20 light years from the cluster center. Typical star densities in the center of a cluster are about 1.5 stars per cubic light year. For comparison, stellar density near the Sun is about 0.003 stars per cubic light year.

Open clusters are often classified according to a scheme developed by Robert Trumpler in 1930. The Trumpler scheme gives a cluster a three-part designation, with a Roman numeral from I-IV for little to very disparate, an Arabic numeral from 1 to 3 for the range in brightness of members (from small to large range), and p, m or r to indication whether the cluster is poor, medium or rich in stars. An 'n' is appended if the cluster lies within nebulosity.

Under the Trumpler scheme, the Pleiades are classified as I3rn, and the nearby Hyades are classified as II3m.

== Numbers and distribution ==
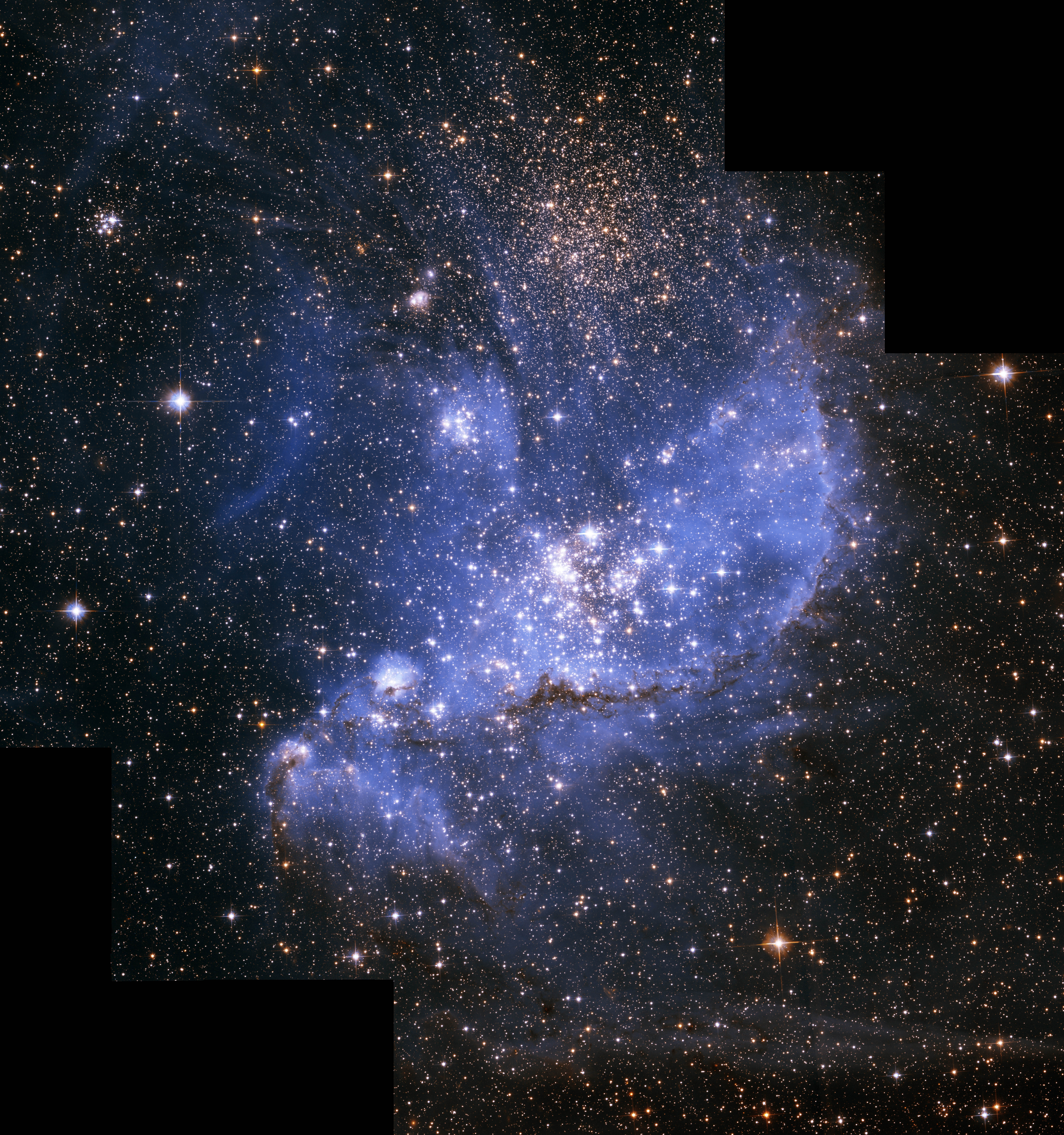
NGC 346, an open cluster in the Small Magellanic Cloud

There are over 1,100 known open clusters in our galaxy, but the true total may be up to ten times higher than that. In spiral galaxies, open clusters are largely found in the spiral arms where gas densities are highest and so most star formation occurs, and clusters usually disperse before they have had time to travel beyond their spiral arm. Open clusters are strongly concentrated close to the galactic plane, with a scale height in our galaxy of about 180 light years, compared with a galactic radius of approximately 50,000 light years.

In irregular galaxies, open clusters may be found throughout the galaxy, although their concentration is highest where the gas density is highest. Open clusters are not seen in elliptical galaxies: Star formation ceased many millions of years ago in ellipticals, and so the open clusters which were originally present have long since dispersed.

In the Milky Way Galaxy, the distribution of clusters depends on age, with older clusters being preferentially found at greater distances from the Galactic Center, generally at substantial distances above or below the galactic plane. Tidal forces are stronger nearer the center of the galaxy, increasing the rate of disruption of clusters, and also the giant molecular clouds which cause the disruption of clusters are concentrated towards the inner regions of the galaxy, so clusters in the inner regions of the galaxy tend to get dispersed at a younger age than their counterparts in the outer regions.

== Stellar composition ==
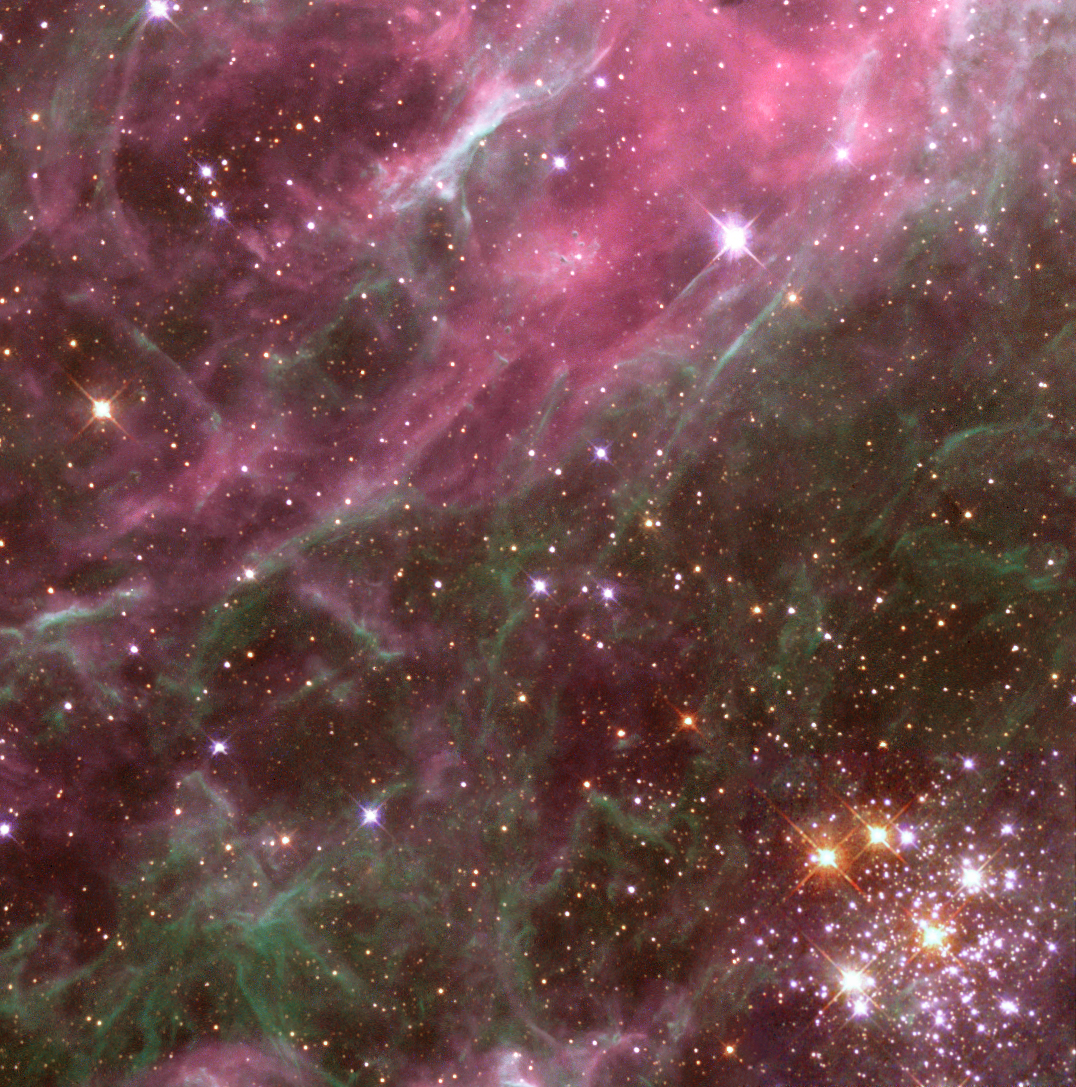
A cluster of stars a few million years old at the lower right illuminates the Tarantula Nebula in the Large Magellanic Cloud.

Because open clusters tend to be dispersed before most of their stars reach the end of their lives, the light from them tends to be dominated by the young, hot blue stars. These stars are the most massive, and have the shortest lives, a few tens of millions of years. The older open clusters tend to contain more yellow stars.

The frequency of binary star systems has been observed to be higher within open clusters than outside open clusters. This is seen as evidence that single stars get ejected from open clusters due to dynamical interactions.

Some open clusters contain hot blue stars which seem to be much younger than the rest of the cluster. These blue stragglers are also observed in globular clusters, and in the very dense cores of globulars they are believed to arise when stars collide, forming a much hotter, more massive star. However, the stellar density in open clusters is much lower than that in globular clusters, and stellar collisions cannot explain the numbers of blue stragglers observed. Instead, it is thought that most of them probably originate when dynamical interactions with other stars cause a binary system to coalesce into one star.

Once they have exhausted their supply of hydrogen through nuclear fusion, medium- to low-mass stars shed their outer layers to form a planetary nebula and evolve into white dwarfs. While most clusters become dispersed before a large proportion of their members have reached the white dwarf stage, the number of white dwarfs in open clusters is still generally much lower than would be expected, given the age of the cluster and the expected initial mass distribution of the stars. One possible explanation for the lack of white dwarfs is that when a red giant expels its outer layers to become a planetary nebula, a slight asymmetry in the loss of material could give the star a 'kick' of a few kilometres per second, enough to eject it from the cluster.

Because of their high density, close encounters between stars in an open cluster are common. For a typical cluster with 1,000 stars with a 0.5 parsec half-mass radius, on average a star will have an encounter with another member every 10 million years. The rate is even higher in denser clusters. These encounters can have a significant impact on the extended circumstellar disks of material that surround many young stars. Tidal perturbations of large disks may result in the formation of massive planets and brown dwarfs, producing companions at distances of 100 AU or more from the host star.

== Eventual fate ==
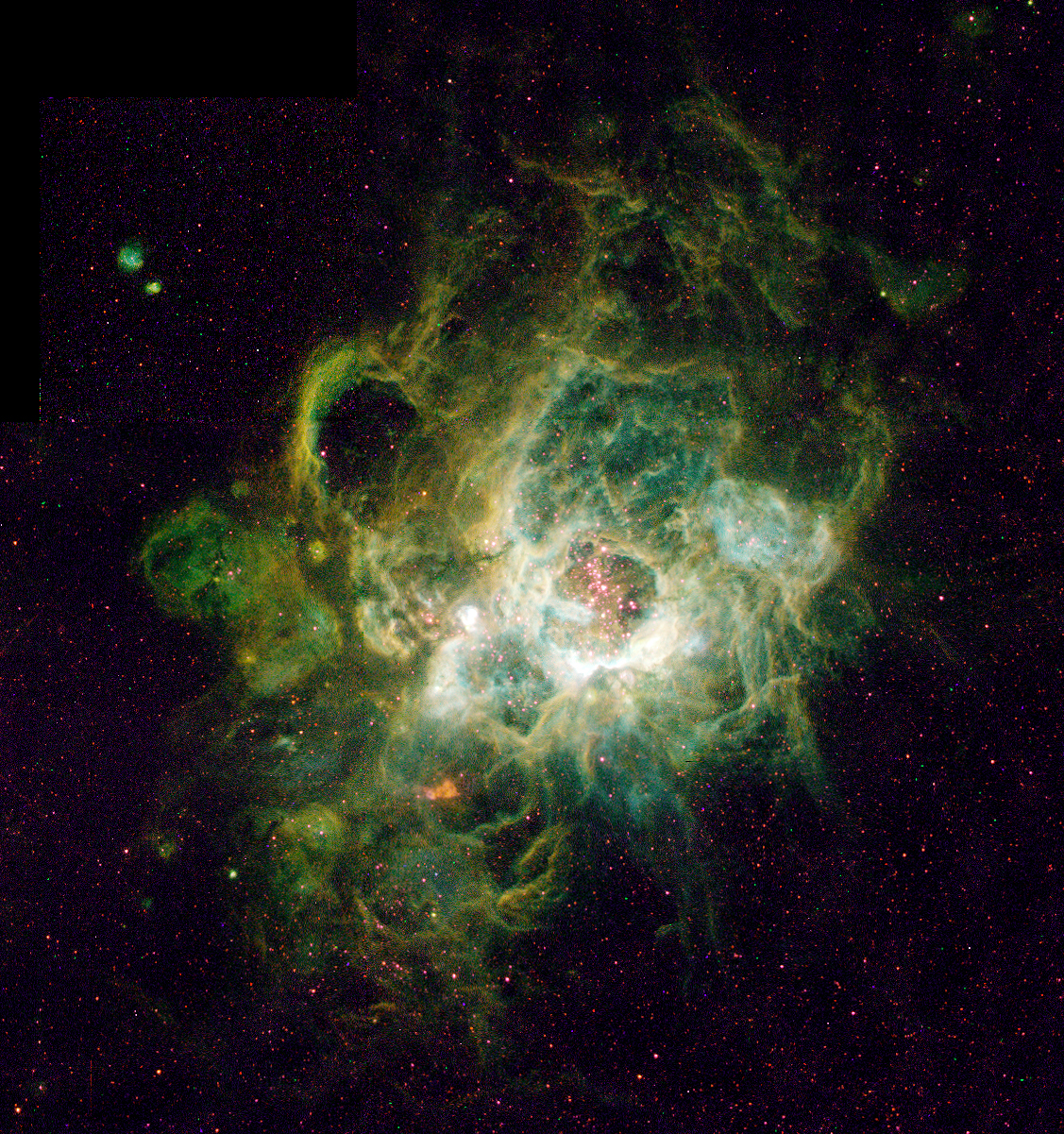
NGC 604 in the Triangulum Galaxy is a very massive open cluster surrounded by an H II region.

Many open clusters are inherently unstable, with a small enough mass that the escape velocity of the system is lower than the average velocity of the constituent stars. These clusters will rapidly disperse within a few million years. In many cases, the stripping away of the gas from which the cluster formed by the radiation pressure of the hot young stars reduces the cluster mass enough to allow rapid dispersal.

Clusters that have enough mass to be gravitationally bound once the surrounding nebula has evaporated can remain distinct for many tens of millions of years, but, over time, internal and external processes tend also to disperse them. Internally, close encounters between stars can increase the velocity of a member beyond the escape velocity of the cluster. This results in the gradual 'evaporation' of cluster members.

Externally, about every half-billion years or so an open cluster tends to be disturbed by external factors such as passing close to or through a molecular cloud. The gravitational tidal forces generated by such an encounter tend to disrupt the cluster. Eventually, the cluster becomes a stream of stars, not close enough to be a cluster but all related and moving in similar directions at similar speeds. The timescale over which a cluster disrupts depends on its initial stellar density, with more tightly packed clusters persisting longer. Estimated cluster half lives, after which half the original cluster members will have been lost, range from 150–800 million years, depending on the original density.

After a cluster has become gravitationally unbound, many of its constituent stars will still be moving through space on similar trajectories, in what is known as a stellar association, moving cluster, or moving group. Several of the brightest stars in the 'Plough' of Ursa Major are former members of an open cluster which now form such an association, in this case the Ursa Major Moving Group. Eventually their slightly different relative velocities will see them scattered throughout the galaxy. A larger cluster is then known as a stream, if we discover the similar velocities and ages of otherwise well-separated stars.

== Studying stellar evolution ==
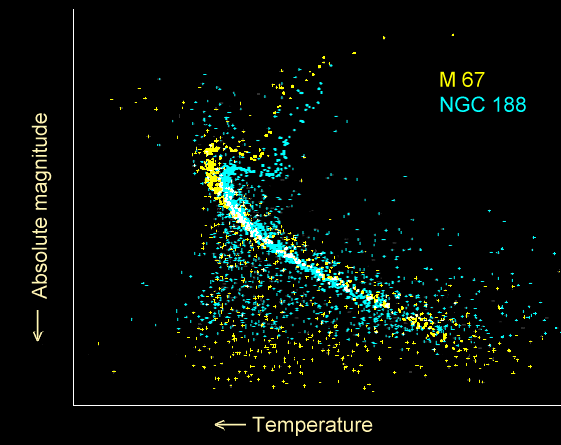
Hertzsprung–Russell diagrams for two open clusters. NGC 188 is older, and shows a lower turn-off from the main sequence than that seen in M67.

When a Hertzsprung–Russell diagram is plotted for an open cluster, most stars lie on the main sequence. The most massive stars have begun to evolve away from the main sequence and are becoming red giants; the position of the turn-off from the main sequence can be used to estimate the age of the cluster.

Because the stars in an open cluster are all at roughly the same distance from Earth, and were born at roughly the same time from the same raw material, the differences in apparent brightness among cluster members are due only to their mass. This makes open clusters very useful in the study of stellar evolution, because when comparing one star with another, many of the variable parameters are fixed.

The study of the abundances of lithium and beryllium in open-cluster stars can give important clues about the evolution of stars and their interior structures. While hydrogen nuclei cannot fuse to form helium until the temperature reaches about 10 million K, lithium and beryllium are destroyed at temperatures of 2.5 million K and 3.5 million K respectively. This means that their abundances depend strongly on how much mixing occurs in stellar interiors. Through study of their abundances in open-cluster stars, variables such as age and chemical composition can be fixed.

Studies have shown that the abundances of these light elements are much lower than models of stellar evolution predict. While the reason for this underabundance is not yet fully understood, one possibility is that convection in stellar interiors can 'overshoot' into regions where radiation is normally the dominant mode of energy transport.

== Astronomical distance scale ==
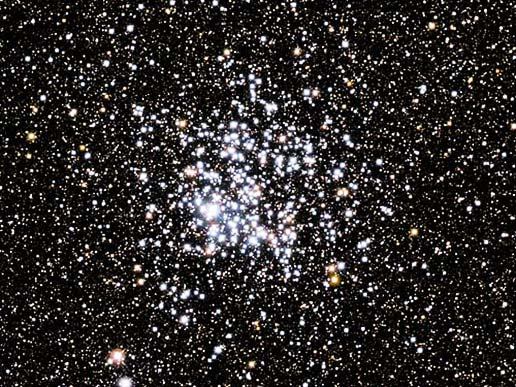
M11, also known as 'the Wild Duck Cluster', is a very rich cluster located towards the center of the Milky Way.

Determining the distances to astronomical objects is crucial to understanding them, but the vast majority of objects are too far away for their distances to be directly determined. Calibration of the astronomical distance scale relies on a sequence of indirect and sometimes uncertain measurements relating the closest objects, for which distances can be directly measured, to increasingly distant objects. Open clusters are a crucial step in this sequence.

The closest open clusters can have their distance measured directly by one of two methods. First, the parallax (the small change in apparent position over the course of a year caused by the Earth moving from one side of its orbit around the Sun to the other) of stars in close open clusters can be measured, like other individual stars. Clusters such as the Pleiades, Hyades and a few others within about 500 light years are close enough for this method to be viable, and results from the Hipparcos position-measuring satellite yielded accurate distances for several clusters.

The other direct method is the so-called moving cluster method. This relies on the fact that the stars of a cluster share a common motion through space. Measuring the proper motions of cluster members and plotting their apparent motions across the sky will reveal that they converge on a vanishing point. The radial velocity of cluster members can be determined from Doppler shift measurements of their spectra, and once the radial velocity, proper motion and angular distance from the cluster to its vanishing point are known, simple trigonometry will reveal the distance to the cluster. The Hyades are the best-known application of this method, which reveals their distance to be 46.3 parsecs.

Once the distances to nearby clusters have been established, further techniques can extend the distance scale to more distant clusters. By matching the main sequence on the Hertzsprung–Russell diagram for a cluster at a known distance with that of a more distant cluster, the distance to the more distant cluster can be estimated. The nearest open cluster is the Hyades: The stellar association consisting of most of the Plough stars is at about half the distance of the Hyades, but is a stellar association rather than an open cluster as the stars are not gravitationally bound to each other. The most distant known open cluster in our galaxy is Berkeley 29, at a distance of about 15,000 parsecs. Open clusters, especially super star clusters, are also easily detected in many of the galaxies of the Local Group and nearby: e.g., NGC 346 and the SSCs R136 and NGC 1569 A and B.

Accurate knowledge of open cluster distances is vital for calibrating the period–luminosity relationship shown by variable stars such as Cepheid stars, which allows them to be used as standard candles. These luminous stars can be detected at great distances, and are then used to extend the distance scale to nearby galaxies in the Local Group. Indeed, the open cluster designated NGC 7790 hosts three classical Cepheids. RR Lyrae variables are too old to be associated with open clusters, and are instead found in globular clusters.

== Planets ==
The stars in open clusters can host exoplanets, just like stars outside open clusters. For example, the open cluster NGC 6811 contains two known planetary systems, Kepler-66 and Kepler-67. Additionally, several hot Jupiters are known to exist in the Beehive Cluster.

== See also ==
- List of open clusters
- Moving groups
- Open cluster family
- Open cluster remnant
