= Friedrich Harms =

German philosopher

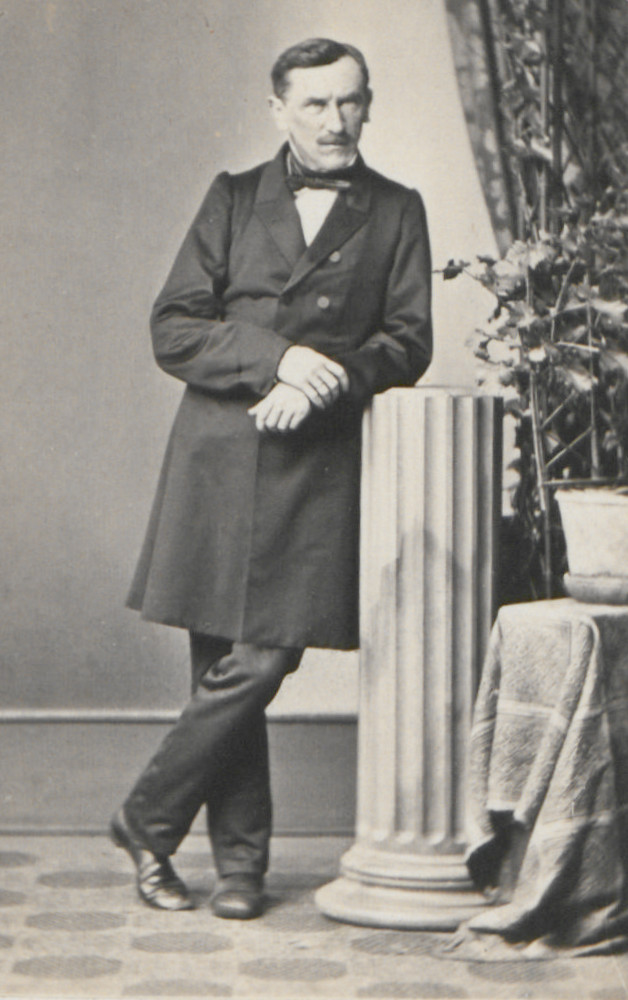
Friedrich Harms

Friedrich Harms (German: [haʁms]; 1819–1880) was a German realist philosopher, much influenced by Fichte.

== Biography ==
Harms was born on 24 October 1819 in Kiel, in the Duchy of Holstein. He studied philosophy at the University of Kiel as a pupil of Heinrich Moritz Chalybäus. In 1842 he obtained his habilitation for philosophy at Kiel, where he later became an associate professor (1848; a full professor in 1858). In 1867 he relocated to the University of Berlin as a professor of philosophy.

He died on 5 April 1880, in Berlin.

== Works ==
- Prolegomena zur Philosophie (1852) – Prolegomena to philosophy.
- Abhandlungen zur systematischen Philosophie (1868) – Essays on systematic philosophy.
- Die Philosophie seit Kant (1876) – Philosophy since Immanuel Kant.
- Ueber die Lehre von Friedrich Heinrich Jacobi (1876) – On the teachings of Friedrich Heinrich Jacobi.
- Geschichte der Logik (1881) – History of logic.
- Logik (1886) edited by Heinrich Wiese.
- Begriff, Formen und Grundlegung der Rechtsphilosophie (1889) edited by Heinrich Wiese.
- Naturphilosophie (1895) edited by Heinrich Wiese.
- Psychologie (1897) edited by Heinrich Wiese.
