= Open cluster remnant =

Final stage in open cluster evolution

In astronomy, an open cluster remnant (OCR) is the final stage in the evolution of an open star cluster.

== Theory ==
Viktor Ambartsumian (1938) and Lyman Spitzer (1940) showed that, from a theoretical point of view, it was impossible for a star cluster to evaporate completely; furthermore, Spitzer pointed out two possible final results for the evolution of a star cluster: evaporation provokes physical collisions between stars, or evaporation proceeds until a stable binary or higher multiplicity system is produced.

== Observations ==
Using objective-prism plates, Lodén (1987, 1988, 1993) has investigated the possible population of open cluster remnants in our Galaxy under the assumption that the stars in these clusters should have similar luminosity and spectral type. He found that about 30% of the objects in his sample could be catalogued as a possible type of cluster remnant. The membership for these objects is ≥ 15. The typical age of these systems is about 150 Myr with a range of 50-200 Myr. They show a significant density of binaries and a large number of optical binaries. The stars of these OCRs have a trend to be massive and hence early-type (A-F) stars although this observational method includes a noticeable selection effect because bright early-type spectra are easier to detect than fainter and later ones. In fact, almost no stars with spectral type later than F appear among his objects.

On the other hand, his results were not fully conclusive because there are known regions in the sky with many stars of the same spectral type but in which it is difficult to find two stars with the same proper motions or radial velocity. A striking example of this fact is Upgren 1; initially, it was suggested that this small group of seven F stars was the remnant of an old cluster (Upgren & Rubin 1965) but later, Gatewood et al. (1988) concluded that Upgren 1 is only a chance alignment of F stars resulting from the close passage of members of two dynamically different sets of stars.

Very recently, Stefanik et al. (1997) have shown that one of the sets is formed by 5 stars including a long-period binary and an unusual triple system.

== Simulations ==
Regarding numerical simulations, for systems with some 25 to 250 stars, von Hoerner (1960, 1963), Aarseth (1968) and van Albada (1968) suggested that the final outcome of the evolution of an open cluster is one or more tightly bound binaries (or even a hierarchical triple system). Van Albada pointed out several observational candidates (σ Ori, ADS 12696, ρ Oph, 1 Cas, 8 Lac and 67 Oph) as being OCRs and Wielen (1975) indicated another one, the Ursa Major moving group (Collinder 285).
