= HD 154672 =

Star in the constellation Ara

Observation data Epoch J2000.0 Equinox ICRS
- Constellation: Ara
- Right ascension: 17^{h} 10^{m} 04.911^{s}
- Declination: −56° 26′ 57.37″
- Apparent magnitude (V): 8.22

Characteristics
- Evolutionary stage: subgiant
- Spectral type: G3 IV
- B−V color index: 0.71

Astrometry
Proper motion (μ)	RA: +30.213 mas/yr Dec.: −124.135 mas/yr
Parallax (π)	15.8188±0.0232 mas
Distance	206.2 ± 0.3 ly (63.22 ± 0.09 pc)
Absolute magnitude (M_{V})	4.12

Details
Mass	1.10±0.02 M_{☉}
Radius	1.32±0.01 R_{☉}
Luminosity	1.77±0.01 L_{☉}
Surface gravity (log g)	4.14±0.04 cgs
Temperature	5,734±23 K
Metallicity [Fe/H]	+0.26±0.02 dex
Rotation	14.8 days
Rotational velocity (v sin i)	4.1±0.2 km/s
Age	6.38±1.25 Gyr

Other designations
- CD−56°6711, HIP 83983, SAO 244476

Database references
SIMBAD	data

HD 154672 is a yellow subgiant (spectral type G3 IV). It is about 65 parsecs away from the Sun that is larger than, but of a similar mass to, the Sun. However, HD 154672 is much older. The star is very metal-rich, which is one of the reasons why it was targeted for a planet search by the N2K Consortium, which discovered the gas giant planet HD 154672 b using Doppler Spectroscopy; the discovery was reported in October 2008. The N2K collaboration chose HD 154672 primarily because it aimed to discover the correlation between a star's metallicity and the mass of orbiting planets.

HD 154672 was targeted by the Magellan Telescopes. It is the host of the first planet discovered from the telescopes by N2K.

== Observational history ==
HD 154672 was first targeted for a planet search in 2004 by the N2K Consortium, a collaboration of astronomers hoping to take radial velocity measurements of previously untargeted stars using Doppler spectroscopy; however, HD 154672 had been previously targeted by a series of surveys, and was previously included in the Henry Draper Catalogue and the catalog of the European Space Agency's Hipparcos satellite.

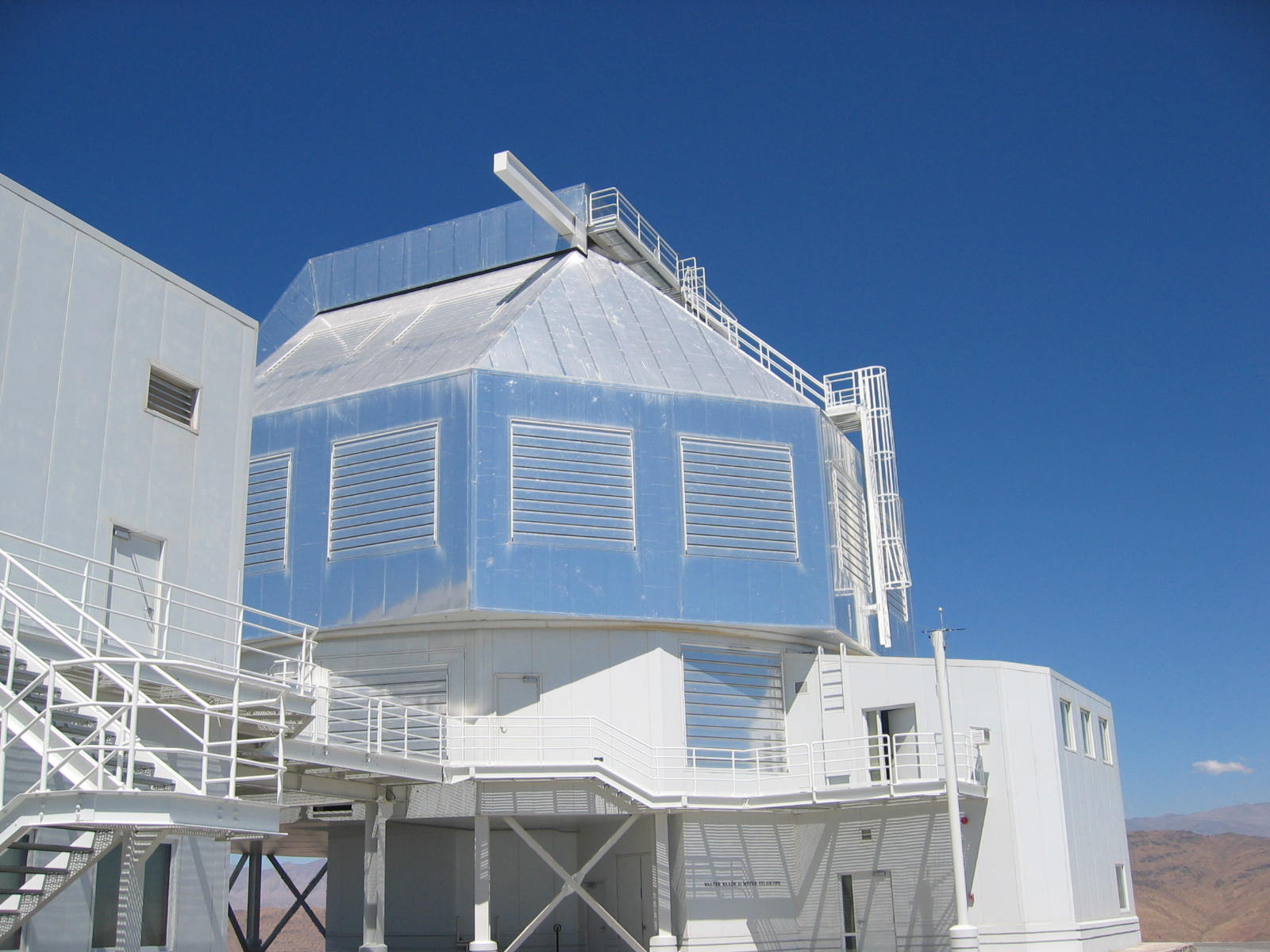
The Magellan Telescopes, which were used to observe HD 154672

N2K deliberately biased its search towards closely orbiting Jupiter-size planets (Hot Jupiters) in the orbit of metal-rich stars, as the consortium hoped to discover how the mass of a planet relates to its host star's metal content. Initially, HD 154672 was noted as a host to a short-orbit Hot Jupiter, although additional observations revealed that the prospective planetary body had a longer orbit than previously expected, as revealed by the Magellan Telescopes at Chile's Las Campanas Observatory.

Use of the Magellan Clay telescope's Magellan Inamori Kyocera Echelle spectrograph (MIKE) helped collect sixteen radial velocity measurements for HD 154672; a team of American astronomers and one from the Vatican City used these measurements to confirm the existence of planet HD 154672 b and to determine its mass.

The discovery of HD 154672's planet was reported in The Astronomical Journal on October 7, 2008 along with a planet in the orbit of HD 205739.

== Host star ==
HD 154672 is a sunlike G-type star that has a mass of 1.1 times that of the Sun and a radius that is 1.3 times that of the Sun. Thus, it is slightly larger than the Sun, although it has a similar mass. The star has an effective temperature of 5,734 K, slightly cooler than the Sun; however, it is far richer in iron, with a measured metallicity of [Fe/H] = 0.26. This means that the star has 1.82 times more iron than the Sun does. HD 154672 is older than the Sun, as its estimated age is estimated at over six billion years. HD 154672's spectrum suggests that the star's chromosphere (its outer layer) is not active.

HD 154672 is located 65.8 parsecs (215 light-years) away from Earth. It has an apparent magnitude (V) of 8.22, making the star too dim to see from Earth with the naked eye. The star is slightly dimmer than planet Neptune as perceived with the naked eye, which has an apparent magnitude of 7.78 at its brightest. The star's actual brightness is measured with an absolute magnitude of 4.12, similar to that of the Sun.

== Planetary system ==
HD 154672 b is a Hot Jupiter, as it is a closely orbiting planet with a high mass. Specifically, HD 154672 has a mass that is 5.02 times greater than Jupiter's mass. It also orbits at a distance of 0.6 AU, or about 60% of the mean distance between the Earth and Sun. This orbit is completed every 163.91 days.

HD 154672 b has an orbital eccentricity of 0.61, denoting a very elliptical orbit. The planet's discoverers noted that if water existed in the planet's atmosphere, it might change from a liquid state to a gaseous state as the planet swings closer to its host star, increasing its temperature.

The HD 154672 planetary system
Companion (in order from star)	Mass	Semimajor axis (AU)	Orbital period (days)	Eccentricity	Inclination (°)	Radius
b	>4.96 M_{J}	0.597	163.94±0.01	0.61±0.03	—	—

== See also ==
- HD 205739
- HD 74156
- 54 Piscium
- HD 80606
- HD 37605
- HD 17156
- HD 89744
