= HD 154672 b =

Extrasolar planet in the constellation Ara

Discovery
- Discovered by: Lopez-Morales et al.
- Discovery site: Las Campanas Observatory
- Discovery date: September 5, 2008
- Detection method: Doppler spectroscopy

Orbital characteristics
- Apastron: 0.961 AU (143,800,000 km)
- Periastron: 0.233 AU (34,900,000 km)
- Semi-major axis: 0.597^{+0.2}_{−0.17} AU
- Eccentricity: 0.61 ± 0.03
- Orbital period (sidereal): 163.94 ± 0.01 d 0.44884 y
- Average orbital speed: 39.8
- Time of periastron: 3045.3 ± 0.1
- Argument of periastron: 265 ± 2
- Star: HD 154672

Physical characteristics
- Mass: 4.96^{+0.4}_{−0.35} M_{J}
- Temperature: 300–600 K (27–327 °C; 80–620 °F)

HD 154672 b is an extrasolar planet located approximately 210 light-years away in the constellation of Ara, orbiting the metal-rich and aged star HD 154672. This planet has a minimum mass five times that of Jupiter and orbits at about 60% the distance between the Earth to the Sun. Its orbit is very elliptical, which causes temperatures on the planet to vary significantly as it proceeds along its orbit. This planet was discovered in Las Campanas Observatory on September 5, 2008 using the radial velocity method (Doppler spectroscopy). Along with HD 205739 b, the planets were the first to be discovered by the N2K Consortium using the Magellan Telescopes.

== Discovery ==
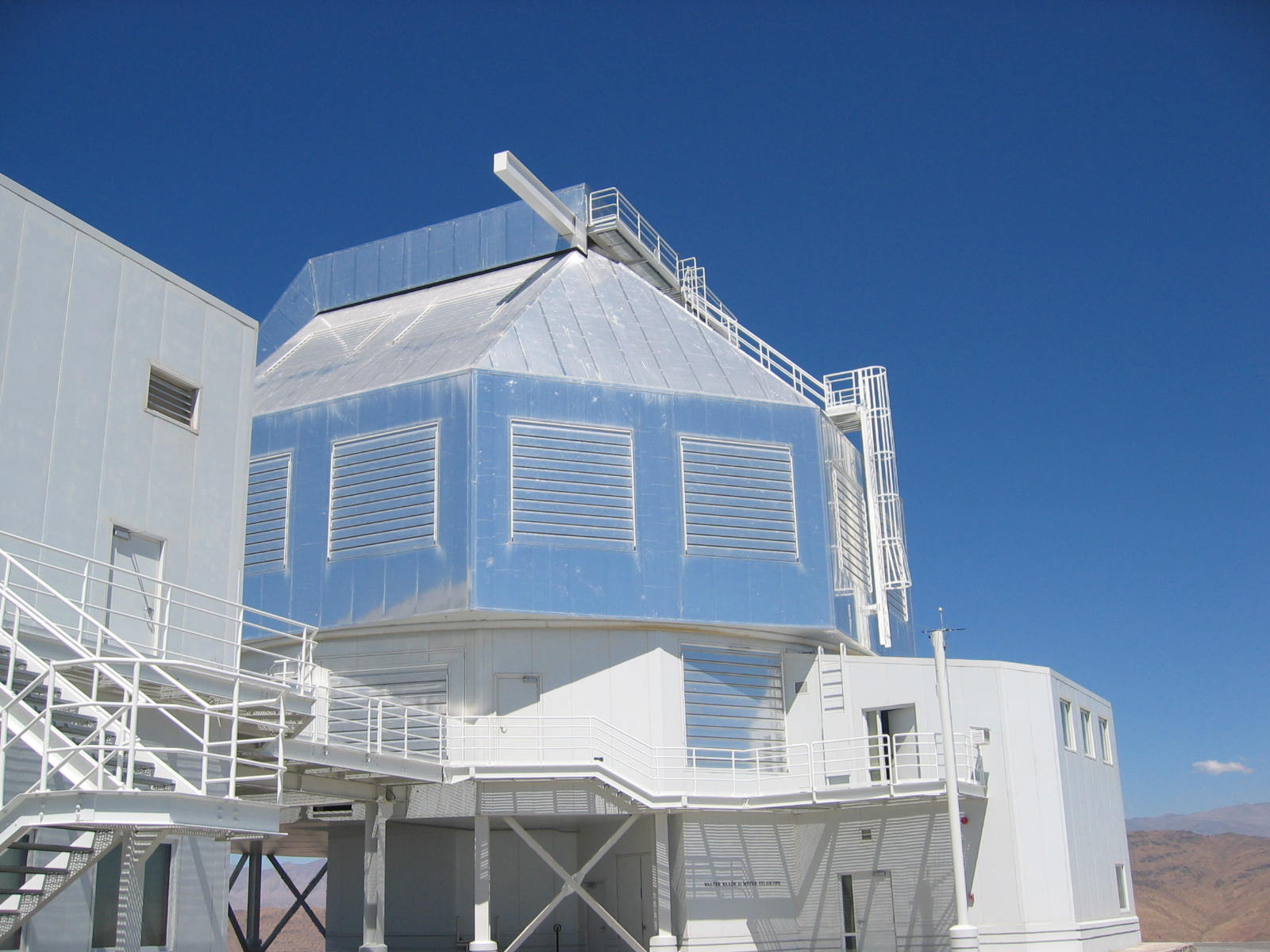
The Magellan Telescopes in Chile, which were used to discover HD 154672 b.

Astronomers hoped to implement a survey called the N2K Consortium, a collaboration which uses Doppler spectroscopy to find radial velocity measurements of stars that hadn't been previously surveyed. The project searched particularly for gas giants with short orbits around metal-rich stars to find how the metallicity of the star and the mass of the planet are related.

Radial velocity observations had been taken by the N2K program using the Magellan Telescopes' Magellan Inamori Kyocera Echelle spectrograph (MIKE) at Las Campanas Observatory in Chile since 2004. Based on these observations, the stars HD 154672 and HD 205739 were among those flagged as potential planetary host stars. The two stars were identified originally as having short-orbit hot Jupiter planets, but 3.5 years of additional observations revealed that the planetary candidates' orbits were far longer than initially anticipated. HD 154672 b's discovery was reported in the Astronomical Journal by the American Astronomical Society, appearing in the journal on October 7, 2008 alongside the planet HD 205739 b. The two planets were the first to be discovered by the N2K program that worked out of the Magellan telescopes.

HD 154672 b was later observed by a different team of astronomers investigating the role of metallicity, or the amount of metal present in a star, in the formation of planets. Six radial velocity measurements of the host star, collected using the HARPS instrument at Chile's La Silla Observatory. The team used the radial velocity data to refine the parameters of HD 154672 b from what was published in its discovery paper a year earlier.

== Host star ==
HD 154672 is a G-type star like the Sun. The star has a mass that is 1.06 times that of the Sun, and a radius 1.27 times the solar radius. The effective temperature, or the temperature it would emit if it were a black body, is 5714 K, slightly cooler than that of the Sun. However, with an [Fe/H] = 0.26 and an age of 9.28 billion years, HD 154672 has 182% more iron than the Sun, and is over two times older than the Sun. Based on its spectrum, HD 154672 is not a very active star.

The apparent magnitude (v) of HD 154672 is 8.22, which means that it is not visible to the naked eye. It is slightly dimmer than Neptune, which has an apparent magnitude of 7.78 at its brightest.

== Characteristics ==
HD 154672 b is a closely orbiting planet that is larger than Jupiter. Its mass was estimated as 5.02 that of Jupiter. HD 154672 b also orbits its host star at a distance of 0.6 AU every 163.91 days. Earth, in comparison, orbits the Sun at a distance of 1 AU every 365.25 days. However, HD 154672 b has an orbital eccentricity of 0.61, which indicates a very elliptical orbit. Because HD 154672 b has such an eccentric orbit, the equilibrium temperature of the planet varies between 300 K and 600 K, which is significantly higher than that of Jupiter (124 K). If liquid water is present in the atmosphere of HD 154672 b, it could possibly convert between gaseous and liquid phases as the planet moves along its orbit.

The high eccentricity of the planet's orbit suggests that either the Kozai mechanism (there is an exchange between the inclination of a planet and its eccentricity) is at work, or that the planet's orbit was distorted by the unstable orbit of other planets that used to be part of the HD 154672 system.

HD 154672 b had, at the time of its 2008 discovery, an orbital period larger than 90% of all discovered planets. It was the seventh planet known to have an eccentricity over 0.6 and an orbit shorter than 300 days.
