= HD 109749 b =

Extrasolar planet orbiting HD 109749

Discovery
- Discovered by: Fischer et al.
- Discovery site: Keck Observatory
- Discovery date: August 22, 2005
- Detection method: Doppler spectroscopy (N2K Consortium)

Orbital characteristics
- Semi-major axis: 0.0615±0.004 AU
- Eccentricity: 0 (fixed)
- Orbital period (sidereal): 5.239891±0.000099 d
- Semi-amplitude: 29.2±1.1
- Star: HD 109749

HD 109749 b is an extrasolar planet that takes only 5.24 days to orbit the star HD 109749 at a distance of 0.063 AU. It was discovered on August 22, 2005, the same day as Gliese 581 b.

== See also ==
- HD 149143 b
