= HR 5183 b =

Eccentric Jupiter

HR 5183
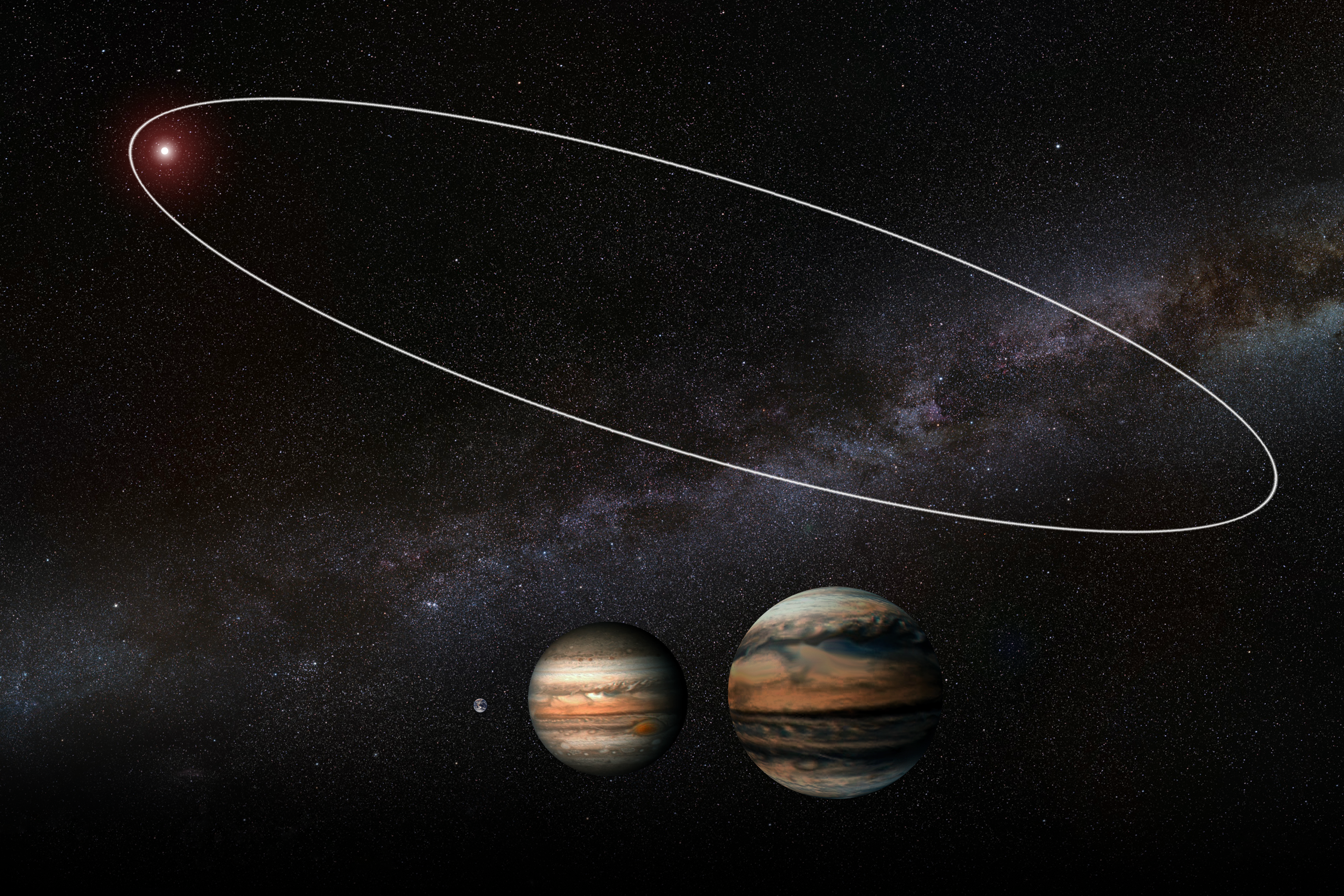
- The planet's orbit and comparison to Jupiter

Discovery
- Discovered by: Blunt et al.
- Discovery date: 2019
- Detection method: Radial velocity

Orbital characteristics
- Periastron: 2.87±0.08 AU
- Apoastron: 41.8+22.1 −10.6 AU
- Semi-major axis: 22.3+11.0 −5.3 AU
- Eccentricity: 0.87±0.04
- Orbital period (sidereal): 102+84 −34 yr
- Inclination: 89.9+13.3 −13.5
- Longitude of ascending node: 224.0+18.2 −20.3
- Time of periastron: 2458122±12
- Argument of periastron: 339.9±1.8
- Semi-amplitude: 38.4±0.6
- Star: HR 5183

Physical characteristics
- Mass: 3.31+0.18 −0.14 M_{J}

HR 5183 b is an exoplanet located 102.7 light years away in the constellation of Virgo orbiting the star HR 5183. It has a mass of 3.31 M_{J}. It has a highly eccentric (e≃0.87) orbit which takes it from within the orbit of Jupiter to beyond the orbit of Neptune (2.87 to 41.8 AU) which classifies it as an eccentric Jupiter and it has been nicknamed the "whiplash planet". It was discovered in 2019 based on two decades of radial velocity observations.

In 2021, astrometric observations revealed that HR 5183 b has a nearly edge-on orbital inclination, and thus its true mass is close to its minimum mass.

== See also ==
- Eccentric Jupiter
- HD 80606 b
- HD 20782 b
