= 16 Cygni =

Multiple star in the constellation Cygnus

- Location of 16 Cygni (circled)

Observation data Epoch J2000.0 Equinox ICRS
- Constellation: Cygnus
- 16 Cygni A
- Right ascension: 19^{h} 41^{m} 48.9535^{s}
- Declination: +50° 31′ 30.220″
- Apparent magnitude (V): 5.96
- 16 Cygni B
- Right ascension: 19^{h} 41^{m} 51.9727^{s}
- Declination: +50° 31′ 03.089″
- Apparent magnitude (V): 6.20
- 16 Cygni C
- Right ascension: 19^{h} 48^{m} 48.8007^{s}
- Declination: +50° 31′ 27.019″

Characteristics
- Spectral type: G1.5Vb / G2.5Vb / M?V
- U−B color index: 0.19 / 0.20 / ?
- B−V color index: 0.64 / 0.66 / ?
- Variable type: None

Astrometry

16 Cyg A
Radial velocity (R_{v})	−27.31(13) km/s
Proper motion (μ)	RA: −148.034(28) mas/yr Dec.: −159.030(28) mas/yr
Parallax (π)	47.3239±0.0197 mas
Distance	68.92 ± 0.03 ly (21.131 ± 0.009 pc)
Absolute magnitude (M_{V})	4.32

16 Cyg B
Radial velocity (R_{v})	−27.87(12) km/s
Proper motion (μ)	RA: −134.482(18) mas/yr Dec.: −162.698(27) mas/yr
Parallax (π)	47.3302±0.0171 mas
Distance	68.91 ± 0.02 ly (21.128 ± 0.008 pc)
Absolute magnitude (M_{V})	4.60

16 Cyg C
Proper motion (μ)	RA: −152.718(205) mas/yr Dec.: −137.818(146) mas/yr
Parallax (π)	47.3292±0.1225 mas
Distance	68.9 ± 0.2 ly (21.13 ± 0.05 pc)

Details

16 Cyg A
Mass	1.057±0.008 M_{☉}
Radius	1.216±0.005 R_{☉}
Luminosity	1.55±0.07 L_{☉}
Surface gravity (log g)	4.292±0.003 cgs
Temperature	5,830±11 K
Metallicity [Fe/H]	0.101±0.008 dex
Rotation	23.8^{+1.5}_{−1.8} d
Rotational velocity (v sin i)	2.23±0.07 km/s
Age	7.01±0.10 Gyr

16 Cyg B
Mass	1.010±0.024 M_{☉}
Radius	1.105±0.009 R_{☉}
Luminosity	1.25±0.05 L_{☉}
Surface gravity (log g)	4.359±0.002 cgs
Temperature	5,751±11 K
Metallicity [Fe/H]	0.054±0.008 dex
Rotation	23.2^{+11.5}_{−3.2} d
Rotational velocity (v sin i)	1.35±0.08 km/s
Age	7.06±0.11 Gyr

Other designations
- Struve 4046, GJ 765.1
- 16 Cygni A: BD+50 2847, HD 186408, HIP 96895, HR 7503, SAO 31898, LTT 15750, Gaia DR3 2135550755683405952
- 16 Cygni B: BD+50 2848, HD 186427, HIP 96901, HR 7504, SAO 31899, LTT 15751, KIC 12069449, Gaia DR3 2135550755683407232
- 16 Cygni C: Gaia DR3 2135550755684554112

Database references
SIMBAD	data
- A
- B
- C

16 Cygni or 16 Cyg is a triple star system approximately 69 light-years away from Earth in the constellation of Cygnus. It consists of two Sun-like yellow dwarf stars, 16 Cygni A and 16 Cygni B, together with a red dwarf, 16 Cygni C. In 1996 an extrasolar planet was discovered in an eccentric orbit around 16 Cygni B.

== Distance ==
The parallax of the two brightest stars were measured as part of the Hipparcos astrometry mission. This yielded a parallax of 47.44 milliarcseconds for 16 Cygni A and 47.14 milliarcseconds for 16 Cygni B. Since the two components are associated, it is reasonable to assume they lie at the same distance, so the different parallaxes are a result of experimental error (indeed, when the associated parallax errors are taken into account, the ranges of the parallaxes overlap). Using the parallax of the A component, the distance is 21.1 parsecs. The parallax of the B component corresponds to a distance of 21.2 parsecs.

== Stellar components ==
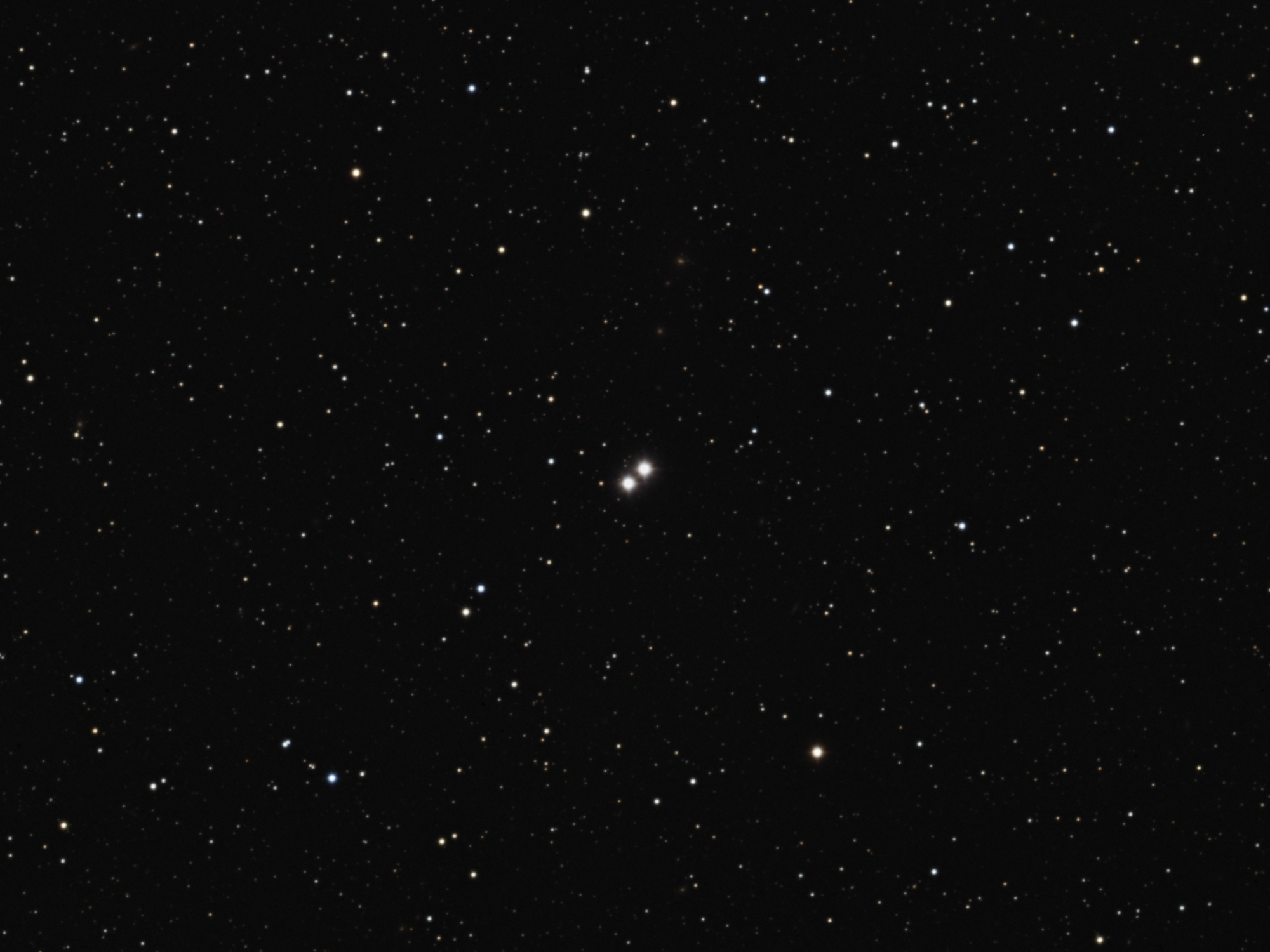
16 Cygni in optical light

16 Cygni is a hierarchical triple system. Stars A and C form a close binary with a projected separation of 73 AU. The orbital elements of the A–C binary are currently unknown. At a distance of 860 AU from A is a third component designated 16 Cygni B. The orbit of B relative to the A–C pair was determined in 1999 and not updated since (as of June 2007): plausible orbits range in period from 18,200 to 1.3 million years, with a semimajor axis ranging from 877 to 15,180 AU. In addition B orbits between 100 and 160 degrees inclination, that is against the A–C pole such that 90 degrees would be ecliptical.

Both 16 Cygni A and 16 Cygni B are yellow dwarf stars similar to the Sun. Their spectral types have been given as G1.5V and G3V, with A being a little hotter than the Sun, and B somewhat cooler. The system was within the field of view of the original mission of the Kepler spacecraft, which collected extremely precise photometric data of the stars. From these measurements, asteroseismology models have calculated precise masses of 1.08 and 1.04 times the solar mass for 16 Cygni A and 16 Cygni B respectively, and independent ages of around 7 billion years for each star. In a 2018 PhD dissertation, astrophysicist Earl Patrick Bellinger used asteroseismic inversion techniques to perform a detailed model-independent analysis of the internal structures of 16 Cyg A and B. While 16 Cyg B’s internal profile closely matched theoretical stellar evolution models, 16 Cyg A showed significant deviations in its core structure compared to best-fitting models. This suggests that standard stellar models may not fully capture the internal physics of stars slightly more massive than the Sun, and highlights the value of asteroseismic inversion for refining stellar theory. The system has also been observed through interferometry, which allowed the determination of the angular diameter of each star. The angular diameters together with the asteroseismology models were used to calculate radii of 1.229 and 1.116 times the solar radius for components A and B respectively.

=== Abundances ===
Despite having the same age and presumably the same primordial composition, observations show a small difference in the metallicity of the two 16 Cygni stars. The primary star has an iron abundance of 1.26 times the solar value, compared to 1.13 for the secondary star. A similar trend has been found for all other metals, with the primary component having an average of 10% more metals than B. One possibility is that this difference is linked to the planet 16 Cygni Bb, since its formation may have removed metals from the protoplanetary disk around 16 Cygni B. However, another study found no difference in heavy element abundances between 16 Cygni A and B.

Another chemical peculiarity between the stars is in their lithium abundance. Measurements of the lithium abundance in the system show a 4 times higher abundance in component A than in 16 Cygni B. Compared to the Sun, 16 Cygni A has 1.66 as much lithium, while 16 Cygni B has only 0.35. It has been hypothesized that the accretion of about 1 Earth mass of metals by 16 Cygni B soon after the system's formation may have destroyed the lithium in the star's atmosphere. Another proposed scenario is the engulfment of a Jupiter-mass planet by 16 Cygni A, which increased the amount of lithium in the star's outer atmosphere.

== Planetary system ==
In 1996 an extrasolar planet in an eccentric orbit was announced around the star 16 Cygni B. The discovery by the radial velocity method was made from independent observations from the McDonald Observatory and Lick Observatory. The planet's orbit takes 799.5 days to complete, with a semimajor axis of 1.69 AU. It has a very high eccentricity of 0.69, which might be the result of gravitational perturbations from 16 Cygni A. In particular, simulations show the planet's eccentricity oscillates between low and high values in timescales of tens of millions of years.

Like the majority of extrasolar planets detectable from Earth, 16 Cygni Bb was deduced from the radial velocity of its parent star. At the time that only gave a lower limit on the mass: in this case, about 1.68 times that of Jupiter. In 2012, two astronomers, E. Plavalova and N.A. Solovaya, showed that the stable orbit would demand about 2.38 Jupiter masses, such that its orbit was inclined at either 45° or 135°.

The eccentric orbit and mass of 16 Cygni Bb makes it extremely unlikely that a terrestrial sized planet will be found orbiting within the star's habitable zone. In a computer simulation, only particles inside approximately 0.3 AU remained stable within a million years of formation, leaving open the possibility of short-period planets. For them, observation rules out any such planet of over a Neptune mass.

There was a METI message sent to the 16 Cygni system. It was transmitted from Eurasia's largest radar—the 70-meter (230-foot) Eupatoria Planetary Radar. The message was named Cosmic Call 1; it was sent on May 24, 1999, and it will reach 16 Cygni in November 2069.

The 16 Cygni B planetary system
Companion (in order from star)	Mass	Semimajor axis (AU)	Orbital period (days)	Eccentricity	Inclination (°)	Radius
b	2.38±0.04 M_{J}	1.693	799.5	0.689±0.011	—	—

== See also ==
- 61 Cygni
- 30 Arietis
- 83 Leonis
- 54 Piscium
- HD 20782
- HD 80606
- HD 89744
- HD 222582
