= HD 205739 b =

Extrasolar planet in the constellation Piscis Austrinus

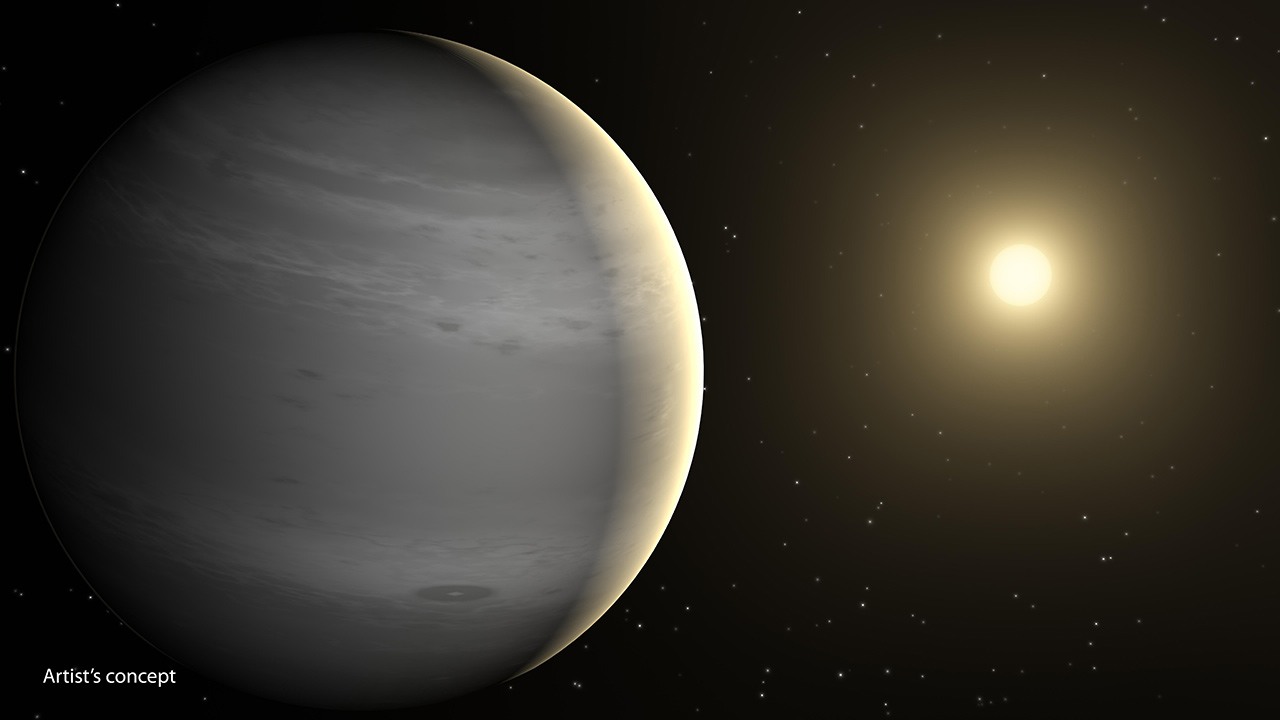
- Artistic representation of HD 205739 b

Discovery
- Discovered by: Lopez-Morales et al.
- Discovery site: Las Campanas Observatory
- Discovery date: September 5, 2008
- Detection method: Doppler spectroscopy

Orbital characteristics
- Apastron: 1.138 AU (170,200,000 km)
- Periastron: 0.654 AU (97,800,000 km)
- Semi-major axis: 0.896^{+0.019}_{−0.015} AU
- Eccentricity: 0.27 ± 0.07
- Orbital period (sidereal): 279.8 ± 0.1 d 0.7660 y
- Average orbital speed: 35.0
- Time of periastron: 3390.7 ± 0.7
- Argument of periastron: 301 ± 8
- Star: HD 205739

HD 205739 b is an extrasolar planet located approximately 350 light-years away. The planet HD 205739 b is named Samagiya. The name was selected in the NameExoWorlds campaign by Sri Lanka, during the 100th anniversary of the IAU. Samagiya means togetherness and unity in the Sinhalese language.

== Discovery ==
HD 205739's designation is from the Henry Draper catalogue. The star was also observed by Hipparcos, which released its catalogue in 1997. The observations that led to the discovery of the planet HD 205739 b started when the N2K Consortium started an extended search for planets around 300 stars not usually targeted by Doppler spectroscopy surveys. In the case of HD 205739, the star was observed using the Magellan Telescopes at Las Campanas Observatory in Chile. HD 205739 was selected primarily because it was a metal-rich star; the N2K collaboration biased their search towards metal-rich stars with closely orbiting Jupiter-size planets, hoping to find a connection between a star's metallicity and its planets' masses.

HD 205739 was flagged originally as a candidate hosting a Hot Jupiter, which is a large gas giant that orbits closely to its star, although later observations suggested that the planetary candidate orbited further out over the next 3.5 years of observation.

The star was studied through the Magellan Inamori Kyocera Echelle spectrograph's (MIKE) ability to use Doppler spectroscopy to measure radial velocity. Twenty-four measurements were recorded for HD 205739. The measurements were analyzed for accuracy. They were then used to derive the planet's characteristics, which led to the planet's confirmation.

The team of astronomers, which were from the United States, Chile, and the Vatican City, sent the paper to the Astronomical Journal on April 7, 2008. The paper was accepted, and was later published on October 7, 2008.

== Host star ==
HD 205739, also named Sāmaya, is an F-type star with a mass that is 1.22 times the mass of the Sun and a size that is 1.33 times the radius of the Sun. In other words, it is slightly more massive and slightly larger than the Sun is. With an effective temperature of 6176 K, HD 205739 is also hotter than the Sun, although it is younger, at an estimated age of 2.84 billion years. The star is rich in iron; its measured metallicity is [Fe/H] = 0.19, or 1.55 times the iron detected in the Sun. After analysis of HD 205739's spectrum, it can be concluded that HD 205739's chromosphere (its outermost layer) is not active. HD 205739 cannot be seen from Earth with the naked eye because the star has an apparent magnitude (V) of 8.56.

== Characteristics ==
HD 205739 b is a Jupiter-size planet. The estimated minimum mass is 1.37 times the mass of Jupiter. The planet has been found to orbit its host star every 279.8 days at a distance of 0.896 AU, which is approximately 89.6% of the mean distance between the Sun and the Earth. HD 205739 b has a mildly elliptical orbit, given its orbital eccentricity of 0.27. The planet's elliptical orbit is typical with respect to discovered planets whose orbits are longer than twenty days and have not grown circular because of tidal forces. According to its discoverers, HD 205739 b's elongated orbit causes its surface temperature to fluctuate by up to 100 K.

== See also ==
- HD 154672 b
