= HD 187123 c =

Eccentric Jovian planet orbiting HD 187123

Discovery
- Discovered by: Wright et al.
- Discovery site: California, USA
- Discovery date: November 2006
- Detection method: radial velocity

Orbital characteristics
- Semi-major axis: 4.417±0.054 AU
- Eccentricity: 0.280±0.022
- Orbital period (sidereal): 3324±46 d
- Time of periastron: 2453625±40
- Argument of periastron: 258.5±3.9
- Semi-amplitude: 25.10±0.44
- Star: HD 187123

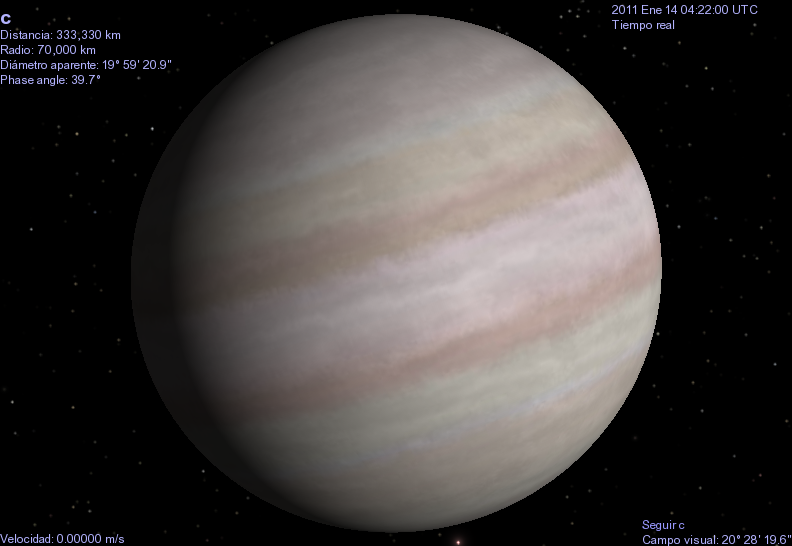
Render of planet

HD 187123 c is an extrasolar planet located approximately 156 light-years away in the constellation of Cygnus, orbiting the star HD 187123. This planet was published in 2006. The radius of the planet's orbit is 4.80 AU, 113 times more distant from the star than first companion. This takes 10 years to orbit. As it is typical for very long-period planets, the orbit is eccentric, referring to as "eccentric Jupiter". At periastron, the orbital distance is 3.60 AU and at apastron, the distance is 6.00 AU. The planet's mass is nearly 2 times that of Jupiter, but is likely to be smaller in size than the inner planet.

== See also ==
- HD 187123 b
