= Eccentric Jupiter =

Jovian planet that orbits its star in an eccentric orbit

A computer simulation of the weather systems on the exoplanet HD 80606 b, an eccentric Jupiter. HD 80606 b's weather is extremely violent due to its highly eccentric orbit

An eccentric Jupiter is a Jovian planet or Jupiter analogue that orbits its star in an eccentric orbit. Eccentric Jupiters may prevent a planetary system from having Earth-like planets (though not always from having habitable exomoons) in it, because a massive gas giant with an eccentric orbit may eject all Earth-mass exoplanets from the habitable zone, if not from the system entirely.

The planets of the Solar System, except for Mercury, have orbits with an eccentricity of less than 0.1. However, two-thirds of the exoplanets discovered in 2006 have elliptical orbits with an eccentricity of 0.2 or more. The typical exoplanet with an orbital period greater than five days has a median eccentricity of 0.23. The discovery of this type of exoplanet, together with hot Jupiters, has challenged some widely-held theories about Solar System formation.

== History of discovery ==
The first exoplanet categorized as an eccentric Jupiter was confirmed in 1996, orbiting 16 Cygni. The first exoplanet around a main sequence star was discovered in 51 Pegasi the previous year. The celestial bodies that revolve around 16 Cygni and 70 Virginis with orbital eccentricities greater than 0.5 were initially regarded as brown dwarfs, prior to more accurate measurements of their masses.

== Formation of eccentric orbits ==
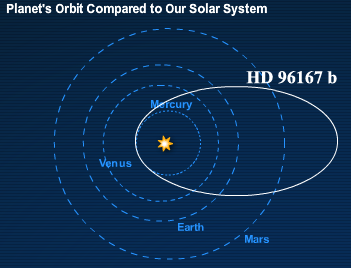
Eccentric Jupiter HD 96167 b has a comet-like orbit.

Various theories about the origin of orbits with high eccentricity compared to the planets of the Solar System have been proposed, and can be modeled and analyzed via computer simulation. One model, termed the "slingshot model", describes such orbits in the case with a hot Jupiter in a multi-planetary system.

In any planetary system, the orbit of a planet is initially close to a perfect circle, but if there are three or more gas giant planets, its orbit will probably become distorted after a certain period of time. In some cases, one planet may be ejected from the system, and the remaining planets will fall into orbits with a very high eccentricity.

This is because the energy exchanged between the three planets during their revolution is concentrated on a specific planet. This phenomenon almost always occurs after a certain period of time, but when there are only one or two giant gas planets (that is, only Jupiter and Saturn in the solar system), the system is more stable over the lifespan of a main sequence star, and such a planet is virtually stable in a circular orbit. Therefore, there is a calculation result that each planet remains in a circular orbit semi-permanently in the solar system. Conversely, if there are three or more giant gas planets, the "fixed period" will be greatly affected by the mass and orbital spacing of the planets. If a massive planet has a narrow orbital spacing, this period will be shorter than the life of the star, and orbital crossing will occur shortly after the formation of the planetary system.

Another theory proposes that the interaction between giant planets and protoplanetary disks may increase eccentricity. However, it is difficult to explain an eccentric planet with an eccentricity exceeding 0.4 with this mechanism. Also, if the planet is orbiting a star belonging to a star system, the gravity of the companion star may increase the orbital eccentricity.

== Relation to hot Jupiters ==
It has been proposed that hot Jupiters, whose orbits have much smaller semi-major axes, evolve from gas giants in high-eccentricity orbits. For instance, an eccentric Jupiter may have an elongated elliptical orbit with periapsis around 0.05 au, and experience tidal braking upon its closest approach to its star. As a result, the planet settles into a roughly circular orbit with a semi-major axis comparable to its original periapsis, and thus receives a greater radiant flux throughout its entire orbit. For example, the eccentric planet HD 80606 b has an extremely elliptical orbit with a periapsis distance of 0.03 au and apoapsis distance of 0.87 au, and may be a celestial body that is transitioning to a hot Jupiter with an orbital radius of 0.03 au.

A limitation of this model is that tidal forces weaken rapidly at greater orbital distances (inversely proportional to the cube of the distance), requiring a planet to orbit closer to the main star for a longer time period to experience sufficient braking. As an example, if another giant planet has a more distant orbit than the celestial body that is evolving into a hot Jupiter, its gravity will change the periapsis distance of the inner planet, and if the potentially evolving body has a stable orbit with a too-distant periapsis, the tidal force will be almost ineffective. In addition, hot Jupiters have been found at slightly more distant orbits – with semi-major axes of at least 0.1 au – but another model is needed to explain these.

== Confusion with multiplanetary systems ==
Some of the detected "eccentric planets" may actually be multiple planets with near-circular orbits. The majority of eccentric planets have been reported based on radial velocity measurements using Doppler spectroscopy by which eccentricity is directly measurable. In the case where the planet is in a circular orbit, the fluctuation pattern of the radial velocity is a simple sine curve, but in the case of an elliptical orbit, it deviates from the sine curve and is recognized as an eccentric planet. However, such a distorted waveform can also occur due to the synthesis of radial velocity fluctuations (wave interference) caused by multiple planets. The two cannot be distinguished if the radial velocity sampling is insufficient (the number of times is small, only a part of the orbital period can be covered, etc.). In this situation, the simplest model that can reproduce the observations is preferred to be a single eccentric planet rather than a multiplanetary system.

Due to these circumstances, there are cases where observations initially attributed to an eccentric planet were instead due to a multiplanetary system with planets in low-eccentricity orbits, due to the accumulation of observations and improvements in analytical techniques. As an example, a study that re-examined 82 planetary systems that were alleged to have a single eccentric planet in 2013 found that multiplanetary models were more accurate than single-planet models; nine multiplanetary systems were reported.

The situation where multiple planetary systems and eccentric planets are confused is likely to occur in cases where the waveform distortion is relatively small, such as when the eccentricity is 0.5 or less when interpreted as a single planet. On the other hand, a planet with an orbital eccentricity of 0.5 or more is considered unlikely to be mistaken for a multiplanetary system.

== List ==
This is a list of eccentric Jupiters:

Planet	a (AU)	e	M_{J}	Notes
54 Piscium b	0.29	0.61	0.22	Might allow for planets at or beyond 0.6 AU
HD 37605 b	0.26	0.73	2.84	Might allow for planets at or beyond 0.8 AU
HD 45350 b	1.92	0.77	1.79	Restricted stable orbits to the innermost 0.2 AU
HD 80606 b	0.45	0.93	4.0	Only beyond 1.75 AU did simulated particles remain
HD 20782 b	1.381	0.97	2.620	
HD 89744 b	0.93	0.67	8.58	No terrestrial planets in the habitable zone
16 Cygni Bb	1.68	0.68	1.68	No terrestrial planets in the habitable zone

== See also ==
- HR 5183 b – Eccentric Jupiter
- HD 80606 b – Eccentric hot Jupiter in the constellation Ursa Major
- HD 20782 b – Extrasolar planet in the constellation Fornax
