= HD 30562 b =

Extrasolar planet in the constellation Eridanus

Discovery
- Discovery date: August 12, 2009
- Detection method: Radial velocity

Orbital characteristics
- Semi-major axis: 2.299+0.032 −0.033 AU
- Eccentricity: 0.748+0.036 −0.042
- Orbital period (sidereal): 1153+14 −15 d 3.158+0.039 −0.042 yr
- Inclination: 65°+17° −22° or 115°+22° −17°
- Longitude of ascending node: 92°+64° −67°
- Time of periastron: 2455914+17 −18
- Argument of periastron: 78.2°+6.7° −6.4°
- Star: HD 30562

Physical characteristics
- Mass: 1.47+0.45 −0.18 M_{J}

HD 30562 b is an extrasolar planet which orbits the F-type main sequence star HD 30562, located approximately 85.4 light years away in the constellation Eridanus.

This planet is unusual that it orbits in a very oval path like comets in the Solar System. The semimajor axis of the orbit is 2.30 AU and it ranges from 0.55 AU to 4.05 AU. It has a minimum mass 1.29 times that of Jupiter. The orbital period of this planet is 38 months compared with 12 months for the Earth.

This eccentric Jupiter was discovered on August 12, 2009 by using the radial velocity method which was designed to study the wobble of stars caused by their planet's gravity over the course of their orbit. Another study confirmed it in 2012. In 2023, the inclination and true mass of HD 30562 b were determined via astrometry.
