= 16 Cygni Bb =

Extrasolar planet

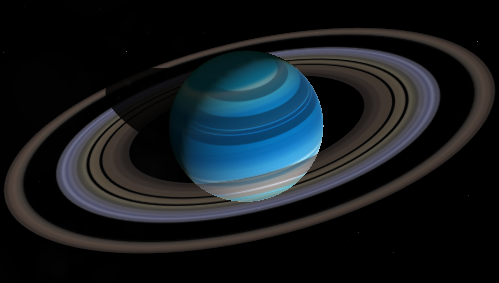
- 16 Cygni Bb rendered in Celestia

Discovery
- Discovered by: William D. Cochran, Artie P. Hatzes, R. Paul Butler, Geoff Marcy
- Discovery site: United States
- Discovery date: 22 October 1996
- Detection method: Radial velocity

Orbital characteristics
- Semi-major axis: 1.681 ± 0.097 AU (251,500,000 ± 14,500,000 km)
- Eccentricity: 0.689 ± 0.011
- Orbital period (sidereal): 798.5 ± 1.0 d
- Inclination: 45 or 135
- Time of periastron: 2,446,549.1 ± 6.6
- Argument of periastron: 83.4 ± 2.1
- Semi-amplitude: 50.5 ± 1.6
- Star: 16 Cygni B

Physical characteristics
- Mass: 2.38 ± 0.04 M_{J}

16 Cygni Bb or HD 186427 b is an extrasolar planet approximately 69 light-years (21 parsecs) away in the constellation of Cygnus. The planet was discovered orbiting the Sun-like star 16 Cygni B, one of two solar-mass (M_{☉}) components of the triple star system 16 Cygni in 1996. It orbits its star once every 799 days and was the first eccentric Jupiter and planet in a double star system to be discovered. The planet is abundant in lithium.

== Discovery ==
On the 22nd of October 1996, the discovery of a planetary-mass companion to the star 16 Cygni B was announced, with a mass at least 1.68 times that of Jupiter (M_{J}). At the time, it had the highest orbital eccentricity of any known planet. The discovery was made by measuring the star's radial velocity.

As the inclination of the orbit cannot be directly measured and as no dynamic model of the system was then published, only a lower limit on the mass could then be determined.

== Orbit ==
The orbit of 16 Cygni Bb (black) compared to the inner planets in the Solar System.

Unlike the planets in the Solar System, the planet's orbit is highly elliptical, and its distance varies from 0.54 AU (50 million mi; 81 million km) at periastron to 2.8 AU (260 million mi; 420 million km) at apastron. This high eccentricity may have been caused by tidal interactions in the binary star system, and the planet's orbit may vary chaotically between low and high-eccentricity states over a period of tens of millions of years.

Preliminary astrometric measurements in 2001 suggested the orbit of 16 Cygni Bb may be highly inclined with respect to our line of sight (at around 173°). This would mean the object's mass may be around 14 M_{J}; the dividing line between planets and brown dwarfs is at 13 M_{J}. However these measurements were later proved useful only for upper limits.

== Physical characteristics ==
Because the planet has only been detected indirectly by measurements of its parent star, properties such as its radius, composition, and temperature are unknown.

A mathematical study in 2012 showed that a mass of about 2.4 M_{J} would be most stable in this system. This would make the body a true planet.

The planet's highly eccentric orbit means the planet would experience extreme seasonal effects. Despite this, simulations suggest that an Earth-like moon, should it have formed in an orbit so close to the parent star, would be able to support liquid water at its surface for part of the year.

== See also ==
- 83 Leonis Bb
- HD 80606 b
- List of exoplanets discovered before 2000
