= HD 30562 =

Star in the constellation Eridanus

- Location of HD 30562 (circled in red)

Observation data Epoch J2000.0 Equinox ICRS
- Constellation: Eridanus
- Right ascension: 04^{h} 48^{m} 36.38509^{s}
- Declination: −05° 40′ 26.5577″
- Apparent magnitude (V): 5.77

Characteristics
- Evolutionary stage: subgiant
- Spectral type: G2IV or G5V or F8V
- Apparent magnitude (B): 6.401
- Apparent magnitude (J): 4.984±0.262
- Apparent magnitude (H): 4.574±0.266
- Apparent magnitude (K): 4.310±0.049
- B−V color index: 0.631±0.003

Astrometry
Radial velocity (R_{v})	77.24±0.09 km/s
Proper motion (μ)	RA: 311.406 mas/yr Dec.: −248.834 mas/yr
Parallax (π)	38.2495±0.0399 mas
Distance	85.27 ± 0.09 ly (26.14 ± 0.03 pc)
Absolute magnitude (M_{V})	3.66

Details
Mass	1.25±0.03 M_{☉}
Radius	1.57±0.03 R_{☉}
Luminosity	2.82±0.01 L_{☉}
Surface gravity (log g)	4.14±0.02 cgs
Temperature	5,983±37 K
Metallicity [Fe/H]	0.23 dex
Rotation	24.2 days
Rotational velocity (v sin i)	5.8 km/s
Age	4.4±0.6 Gyr

Other designations
- BD−05°1044, GJ 177.1, HD 30562, HIP 22336, HR 1536, SAO 131504, PPM 187358, NLTT 13980, GCRV 2828

Database references
SIMBAD	data
Exoplanet Archive	data
ARICNS	data

HD 30562 is a star in the equatorial constellation of Eridanus. It has a golden hue and can be viewed with the naked eye under good seeing conditions, having an apparent visual magnitude of 5.77. The distance to this star is 85 light years based on parallax. It is drifting further away with a high radial velocity of +77 km/s, having come to within 46.8 light-years some 236,000 years ago.

The stellar classification of HD 30562 has varied somewhat depending on the study, including types G2IV, G5V, and F8V. It is about 4.4 billion years old and appears to be chromospherically inactive. The star is spinning with a projected rotational velocity of 5.8 km/s, giving it a rotation period of 24.2 days. Based on the abundance of iron appearing in the sprectrum, the metallicity of this star, what astronomers term the abundance of elements with higher atomic numbers than helium, is about 70% higher than in the Sun. HD 30562 has 25% greater mass than the Sun and a 57% larger radius. The star is radiating almost three times the luminosity of the Sun from its photosphere at an effective temperature of 5,983 K.

== Planetary system ==
In August 2009, it was found that this star has a Jupiter-like planet that orbits in a very eccentric path. In 2023, the inclination and true mass of HD 30562 b were determined via astrometry.

The HD 30562 planetary system
Companion (in order from star)	Mass	Semimajor axis (AU)	Orbital period (years)	Eccentricity	Inclination (°)	Radius
b	1.47+0.45 −0.18 M_{J}	2.299+0.032 −0.033	3.158+0.039 −0.042	0.748+0.036 −0.042	65+17 −22 or 115+22 −17	—

== See also ==
- List of extrasolar planets
