= HD 150706 =

G-type star in the constellation Ursa Minor

Observation data Epoch J2000.0 Equinox ICRS
- Constellation: Ursa Minor
- Right ascension: 16^{h} 31^{m} 17.583^{s}
- Declination: +79° 47′ 23.20″
- Apparent magnitude (V): 7.016

Characteristics
- Evolutionary stage: main sequence
- Spectral type: G0V
- B−V color index: 0.607±0.005

Astrometry
Radial velocity (R_{v})	−17.208±0.0009 km/s
Proper motion (μ)	RA: 94.947 mas/yr Dec.: −86.853 mas/yr
Parallax (π)	35.4827±0.0135 mas
Distance	91.92 ± 0.03 ly (28.18 ± 0.01 pc)
Absolute magnitude (M_{V})	4.76

Details
Mass	1.04^{+0.01}_{−0.04} M_{☉}
Radius	0.96±0.02 R_{☉}
Luminosity	1.18 L_{☉}
Surface gravity (log g)	4.47±0.03 cgs
Temperature	5,921±50 K
Metallicity [Fe/H]	−0.07±0.04 dex
Rotation	≈5.6 days
Rotational velocity (v sin i)	3.7±1.0 km/s
Age	1.59^{+3.03}_{−0.17} Gyr

Other designations
- BD+80°519, GJ 632, HD 150706, HIP 80902, SAO 8557, TYC 4575-1336-1

Database references
SIMBAD	data

HD 150706 is a star with an orbiting exoplanet in the northern constellation of Ursa Minor. It is located 92 light years away from the Sun, based on parallax measurements. At that distance, it is not visible to the unaided eye. However, with an apparent visual magnitude of 7.02, it is an easy target for binoculars. It is located only about 10° from the northern celestial pole so it is always visible in the northern hemisphere except for near the equator. Likewise, it is never visible in most of the southern hemisphere. The star is drifting closer to the Sun with a radial velocity of −17.2 km/s.

The Sun-like spectrum of HD 150706 presents as a G-type main-sequence star with a stellar classification of G0V. It has a similar mass, radius, and metallicity as the Sun. The star is radiating 1.18 times the luminosity of the Sun from its photosphere at an effective temperature of 5,921 K. It displays magnetic activity in its chromosphere in the form of star spots. Age estimates are poorly bounded, ranging from 1.16 up to 5.1 billion years.

Based on an infrared excess, a dusty debris disk is orbiting the star. There is a hole in the center of this disk with a radius of ~20 AU. It may be kept free of dust by a planetary system.

== Exoplanet ==
The existence of an exoplanet orbiting this star was announced at the Scientific Frontiers in Research on Extrasolar Planets conference in 2002. The claimed planet had a minimum mass equal to the mass of Jupiter and was thought to be located in an elliptical orbit with a period of 264 days. However independent measurements of the star failed to confirm the existence of this planet.

A different planet was discovered in the system in 2012; this Jupiter-twin completes one orbit in roughly 16 years. Its eccentricity and orbit is very poorly constrained. In 2023, the inclination and true mass of HD 150706 b were determined via astrometry, and its orbit was revised, finding a substantially wider but still poorly constrained orbit with a period of about 36 years.

The HD 150706 planetary system
Companion (in order from star)	Mass	Semimajor axis (AU)	Orbital period (years)	Eccentricity	Inclination (°)	Radius
b	2.43+0.48 −0.38 M_{J}	11.5+5.0 −2.4	36.0+26.0 −11.0	0.787+0.076 −0.083	70+14 −17 or 110+17 −14	—

== See also ==
- HD 149143
- List of extrasolar planets
