= HD 187123 b =

Hot Jupiter orbiting HD 187123 in the constellation Cygnus

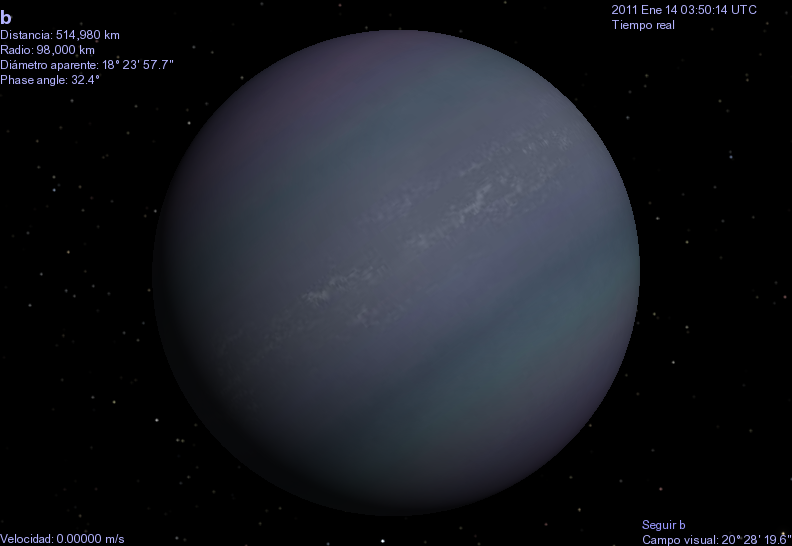
- Artist's impression of HD 187123 b

Discovery
- Discovered by: Butler, Marcy, Vogt, Apps et al.
- Discovery site: California, United States
- Discovery date: 9 September 1998
- Detection method: radial velocity

Orbital characteristics
- Semi-major axis: 0.04213±0.00034 AU
- Eccentricity: 0.0093±0.0046
- Orbital period (sidereal): 3.0965828±0.0000043 d
- Time of periastron: 2454342.87±0.30
- Argument of periastron: 360±200
- Semi-amplitude: 68.91±0.36
- Star: HD 187123

HD 187123 b is a typical "hot Jupiter" located approximately 150 light-years away in the constellation of Cygnus, orbiting the star HD 187123. It has a mass about half that of Jupiter and it orbits in a very tight, round orbit around the star every three days.

The star has also been monitored for possible transits by the planet, but none was found.

The presence of water has been detected in the atmosphere of HD 187123 b with high confidence.

== See also ==
- HD 187123 c
- List of exoplanets discovered before 2000
