= HD 187123 =

Star in the constellation Cygnus

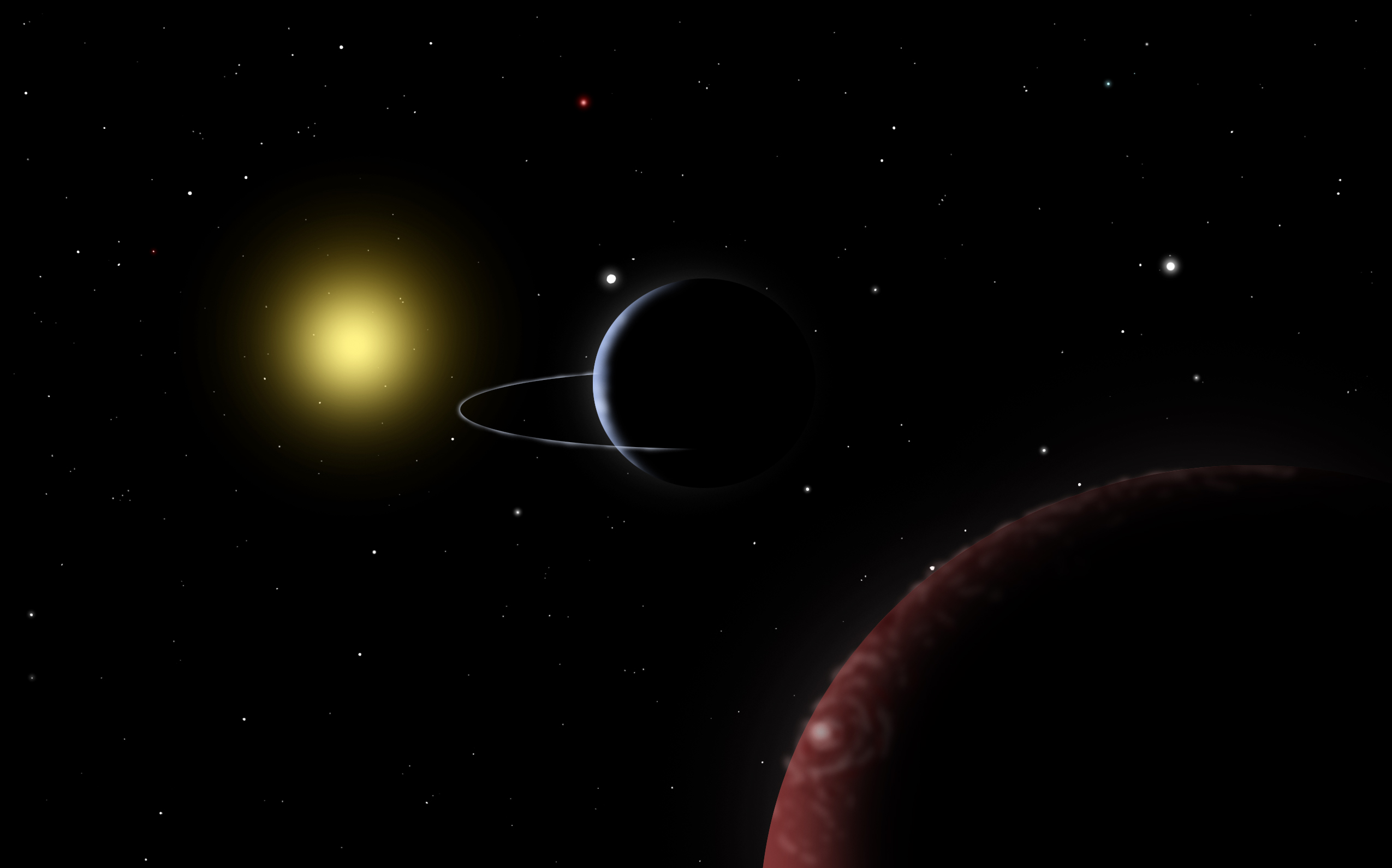
- HD 187123 has a planetary system with at least two planets in it. Artist's rendition of planets HD 187123 b and c.

Observation data Epoch J2000.0 Equinox ICRS
- Constellation: Cygnus
- Right ascension: 19^{h} 46^{m} 58.1122^{s}
- Declination: +34° 25′ 10.281″
- Apparent magnitude (V): 7.83

Characteristics
- Spectral type: G2V
- B−V color index: 0.661±0.010

Astrometry
Radial velocity (R_{v})	−16.91(12) km/s
Proper motion (μ)	RA: 142.591(15) mas/yr Dec.: −123.715(18) mas/yr
Parallax (π)	21.7166±0.0157 mas
Distance	150.2 ± 0.1 ly (46.05 ± 0.03 pc)
Absolute magnitude (M_{V})	4.41

Details
Mass	1.06±0.02 M_{☉}
Radius	1.17±0.03 R_{☉}
Luminosity	1.44±0.02 L_{☉}
Surface gravity (log g)	4.32±0.03 cgs
Temperature	5,853±53 K
Metallicity [Fe/H]	0.121±0.030 dex
Rotational velocity (v sin i)	2.15±0.50 km/s
Age	5.6±1.3 Gyr

Other designations
- BD+34°3708, HD 187123, HIP 97336, SAO 68845, LTT 15779

Database references
SIMBAD	data

HD 187123 is a single, yellow-hued star with two exoplanetary companions in the northern constellation of Cygnus. It has an apparent visual magnitude of 7.83, making it an 8th magnitude star that is too faint to be visible with the naked eye. However, it should be easy target with binoculars or small telescope. The system is located at a distance of 150 light years from the Sun based on parallax measurements, but is drifting closer with a radial velocity of −17 km/s.

== Description ==
This is an ordinary G-type main-sequence star with a stellar classification of G2V. The physical properties of this star are sufficiently similar to the Sun that it has been considered a solar analog, although the metallicity is higher. It is estimated to be five or six billion years old and is spinning with a projected rotational velocity of 2 km/s. The star has a similar mass to the Sun but is slightly larger with 117% of the Sun's radius. It is radiating 1.44 times the luminosity of the Sun from its photosphere at an effective temperature of 5,853 K.

== Planetary system ==
In 1998 the California and Carnegie Planet Search team, after following a suggestion by Kevin Apps, a Briton who at the time was an undergraduate student found a possible planet orbiting the star. There were also indications of another, more distant body orbiting the star and this claim was published in 2006. This planet was confirmed in 2009. The presence of water has been detected in the atmosphere of HD 187123 b with high confidence.

In 2025, the use of astrometry allowed the inclination and true mass of planet c to be found.

The HD 187123 planetary system
Companion (in order from star)	Mass	Semimajor axis (AU)	Orbital period (days)	Eccentricity	Inclination (°)	Radius
b	>0.5074±0.0026 M_{J}	0.04213±0.00034	3.0965886±0.0000043	0.0093±0.0046	—	—
c	2.87+0.40 −0.42 M_{J}	4.69+0.08 −0.13	3,393±26	0.298±0.020	137.2+5.8 −9.1	—

== See also ==
- List of extrasolar planets
- List of exoplanets discovered before 2000 - HD 187123 b
- List of exoplanets discovered between 2000–2009 - HD 187123 c
