= HD 89744 b =

Eccentric Jupiter exoplanet orbiting the star HD 89744

Discovery
- Discovered by: Korzennik et al.
- Discovery site: Whipple Observatory
- Discovery date: 2000
- Detection method: Doppler spectroscopy

Orbital characteristics
- Semi-major axis: 0.917±0.009 AU
- Eccentricity: 0.677±0.003
- Orbital period (sidereal): 256.78±0.02 d
- Argument of perihelion: 193.7±0.4 º
- Semi-amplitude: 269.66±1.45 m/s
- Star: HD 89744

Physical characteristics
- Mass: ≥8.35±0.18 M_{J}

HD 89744 b is an eccentric Jupiter extrasolar planet orbiting the star HD 89744.

In a simulation of a 10 million year span, this planet swept away all test particles "except for a narrow region near the 8:3 resonance". There can be no planets in this star's habitable zone. Observation has ruled out any planet over 0.7 Jupiter mass within a year period.

== See also ==
- List of exoplanets discovered before 2000
