= HD 149143 =

Star in the constellation Ophiuchus

HD 149143 / Rosalíadecastro
Observation data Epoch J2000 Equinox ICRS
- Constellation: Ophiuchus
- Right ascension: 16^{h} 32^{m} 51.051^{s}
- Declination: +02° 05′ 05.38″
- Apparent magnitude (V): 7.89

Characteristics
- Evolutionary stage: subgiant
- Spectral type: G0 IV or G3V
- B−V color index: 0.680

Astrometry
Radial velocity (R_{v})	12.104±0.0054 km/s
Proper motion (μ)	RA: −9.240 mas/yr Dec.: −86.678 mas/yr
Parallax (π)	13.6279±0.0247 mas
Distance	239.3 ± 0.4 ly (73.4 ± 0.1 pc)
Absolute magnitude (M_{V})	3.87

Details
Mass	1.1±0.1 M_{☉}
Radius	1.302^{+0.083}_{−0.041} R_{☉}
Luminosity	2.278±0.008 L_{☉}
Surface gravity (log g)	4.10 cgs
Temperature	6,213 K
Metallicity [Fe/H]	0.20±0.05 dex
Rotational velocity (v sin i)	3.9 km/s
Age	7.6±1.2 Gyr

Other designations
- Rosalíadecastro, BD+02°3127, HD 149143, HIP 81022, SAO 121678, PPM 162774

Database references
SIMBAD	data
Exoplanet Archive	data

HD 149143, also called Rosalíadecastro, is a star with a close orbiting exoplanet in the constellation Ophiuchus. Its apparent visual magnitude is 7.89 (a binocular object) and the absolute magnitude is 3.87. The system is located at a distance of 239 light-years from the Sun based on parallax measurements, and it is drifting further away with a radial velocity of 12 km/s.

On December 17, 2019, as part of the IAU's NameExoWorlds project, the star HD 149143 was given the name Rosalíadecastro in honour of the Galician poet Rosalía de Castro, who was a significant figure of Galician culture and prominent writer in Galician overall, but in Spanish too, whose work often referenced the night and celestial objects. The exoplanet companion was named Riosar in honour of the Sar river in Galicia that was present in much of the literary work of the author Rosalía de Castro.

This is a slightly evolved star with a stellar classification of G0 that is overluminous for a high-metallicity G-type dwarf. It has 1.1 times the mass of the Sun and 1.3 times the Sun's radius. The star has an estimated age of around 7.6 billion years and is spinning with a projected rotational velocity of 3.9 km/s. It is radiating 2.3 times the luminosity of the Sun from its photosphere at an effective temperature of 6,213 K.

== Planetary system ==
HD 149143 b, the planet that orbits HD 149143, was discovered by the N2K Consortium during their search for short-period gas giant planets around metal-rich stars. The planet was independently discovered by the Elodie metallicity-biased search for transiting Hot Jupiters.

The HD 149143 planetary system
Companion (in order from star)	Mass	Semimajor axis (AU)	Orbital period (days)	Eccentricity	Inclination (°)	Radius
b (Riosar)	≥1.33±0.15 M_{J}	0.053±0.0029	4.07182±0.00001	0.0167±0.004	—	1.05 R_{J}

== See also ==
- HD 109749
- HD 150706
- List of proper names of stars
- Lists of exoplanets
