= HD 74156 c =

Gas giant

Discovery
- Discovered by: Dominique Naef, Michel Mayor et al.
- Discovery site: California
- Discovery date: Apr 4, 2001
- Detection method: Radial velocity

Orbital characteristics
- Semi-major axis: 3.678+0.145 −0.159 AU
- Eccentricity: 0.377±0.006
- Orbital period (sidereal): 2,448.5 ± 4.2 days (6.704 ± 0.011 a)
- Inclination: 120.162°+7.601° −66.225°
- Longitude of ascending node: 210.652°+7.606° −42.039°
- Time of periastron: 2448568.530+13.016 −11.742
- Argument of periastron: 271.934°+1.178° −1.505°
- Semi-amplitude: 113.940+0.974 −1.099 m/s
- Star: HD 74156

Physical characteristics
- Mass: 8.665+1.385 −0.470 M_{J}

HD 74156 c is an extrasolar planet with a minimum mass about eight times that of Jupiter orbiting the star HD 74156. It is most likely a gas giant. This planet was discovered by Dominique Naef and Michel Mayor in April 2001 together with the planet HD 74156 b. In 2022, the inclination and true mass of HD 74156 c were measured via astrometry.
