= HD 74156 b =

Exoplanet that orbits the star HD 74516

Discovery
- Discovered by: Dominique Naef, Michel Mayor et al.
- Discovery site: California
- Discovery date: Apr 4, 2001
- Detection method: Radial velocity

Orbital characteristics
- Semi-major axis: 0.2916±0.0033 AU
- Eccentricity: 0.6380±0.0061
- Orbital period (sidereal): 51.6385±0.0015 d
- Time of periastron: 2450793.39±0.11
- Argument of periastron: 175.35±0.92
- Semi-amplitude: 109.1±1.6
- Star: HD 74156

HD 74156 b is an extrasolar planet at least 1.88 times the mass of Jupiter that orbits the star HD 74156. It is most likely a gas giant. This planet was discovered in April 2001 by Dominique Naef and Michel Mayor along with the second planet HD 74156 c.
