= HD 109749 =

Binary star system in the constellation Centaurus

Observation data Epoch J2000.0 Equinox ICRS
- Constellation: Centaurus
- Right ascension: 12^{h} 37^{m} 16.379^{s}
- Declination: −40° 48′ 43.63″
- Apparent magnitude (V): 8.08

Characteristics
- Spectral type: G3 IV or G3 V + K5 V
- B−V color index: 0.714±0.021

Astrometry
Radial velocity (R_{v})	−13.24±0.18 km/s
Proper motion (μ)	RA: −157.308 mas/yr Dec.: −6.357 mas/yr
Parallax (π)	15.8134±0.0263 mas
Distance	206.3 ± 0.3 ly (63.2 ± 0.1 pc)
Absolute magnitude (M_{V})	4.34

Details

HD 109749 A
Mass	1.10 M_{☉}
Radius	1.21±0.02 R_{☉}
Luminosity	1.55±0.02 L_{☉}
Surface gravity (log g)	4.32±0.02 cgs
Temperature	5,860±39 K
Metallicity [Fe/H]	0.25±0.05 dex
Rotation	34 d
Rotational velocity (v sin i)	2.5±0.5 km/s
Age	4.10±0.70 Gyr

HD 109749 B
Mass	0.78 M_{☉}

Other designations
- CD−40 7393, HD 109749, HIP 61595, SAO 223556, WDS J12373-4049, 2MASS J12371639-4048435, Gaia DR2 6147000074988843264

Database references
SIMBAD	data

HD 109749 is a binary star system about 206 light years away in the constellation of Centaurus. The pair have a combined apparent visual magnitude of 8.08, which is too faint to be visible to the naked eye. The primary component has a close orbiting exoplanet companion. The system is drifting closer with a heliocentric radial velocity of −13.2 km/s.

The primary component, HD 109749 A, is a G-type subgiant star with a spectral type of G3IV, indicating it is an evolved star with a luminosity higher than that of a main sequence star. It has a mass of 1.14 M_{☉} and a radius of 1.21 R_{☉}. The star is shining with a luminosity of 1.55 L_{☉} and has an effective temperature of 5,860 K. Evolutionary models estimate an age of 4.1 billion years. HD 109749 A is chromospherically inactive and has a high metallicity, with an iron abundance 178% of Sun's.

The secondary, HD 109749 B, is a K-type main sequence star with an apparent magnitude of 10.3. It has a mass of about 0.78 M_{☉} and is located at a separation of 8.4 arcseconds, which corresponds to a projected separation of 490 AU. This star has the same proper motion as the primary and seems to be at the same distance, confirming they form a physical binary system.

== Planetary system ==
In 2005, an exoplanet was discovered around HD 109749 A. It was detected by the radial velocity method as part of the N2K Consortium. It is a hot Jupiter with a minimum mass of 0.28 M_{J} and a semimajor axis of 0.06 AU.

The HD 190949 A planetary system
Companion (in order from star)	Mass	Semimajor axis (AU)	Orbital period (days)	Eccentricity	Inclination (°)	Radius
Ab	≥0.27±0.045 M_{J}	0.0615±0.004	5.239891±0.000099	0 (fixed)	—	—

== See also ==
- HD 149143
- List of extrasolar planets
