= HD 149143 b =

Extrasolar planet

Riosar/HD 149143 b
Discovery
- Discovered by: Fischer et al.
- Discovery site: Haute-Provence Observatory
- Discovery date: 22 August 2005
- Detection method: Doppler Spectroscopy

Orbital characteristics
- Semi-major axis: 0.053±0.0029 AU
- Eccentricity: 0.0167±0.004
- Orbital period (sidereal): 4.07182±0.00001 d
- Time of periastron: 2463199.12±0.2
- Argument of periastron: 217±17
- Semi-amplitude: 150.3±0.65
- Star: Rosalíadecastro (HD 149143)

HD 149143 b, formally named Riosar, is an extrasolar planet that has a minimum mass of 1.33 Jupiter masses. As is typical for a lot of hot Jupiters, its orbital eccentricity is low.

== Name ==
The star HD 149143 and its orbiting planet HD 149143 b have been assigned to be named by Spain in 2019's IAU100 NameExoWorlds project. On December 17, 2019, by majority vote in the Spanish Astronomical Association, HD 149143 was given the name Rosalíadecastro in honour of the Spanish poet Rosalía de Castro, who was a significant figure of Galician culture and prominent Spanish writer, whose pioneering work often referenced the night and celestial objects. The planet that orbits it, HD 149143 b, was assigned the name Riosar in honour of the Sar River that was present in much of the literary work of the Spanish author Rosalía de Castro.
