= HD 74156 =

Star in the constellation Hydra

Observation data Epoch J2000.0 Equinox ICRS
- Constellation: Hydra
- Right ascension: 08^{h} 42^{m} 25.12195^{s}
- Declination: +04° 34′ 41.1457″
- Apparent magnitude (V): +7.614

Characteristics
- Evolutionary stage: subgiant
- Spectral type: G1V
- B−V color index: 0.581

Astrometry
Radial velocity (R_{v})	3.90±0.13 km/s
Proper motion (μ)	RA: 24.666±0.025 mas/yr Dec.: −200.238±0.019 mas/yr
Parallax (π)	17.4242±0.0247 mas
Distance	187.2 ± 0.3 ly (57.39 ± 0.08 pc)
Absolute magnitude (M_{V})	+3.57

Details
Mass	1.24 M_{☉}
Radius	1.64 ± 0.19 R_{☉}
Luminosity (bolometric)	3.037 ± 0.485 L_{☉}
Surface gravity (log g)	4.4 ± 0.15 cgs
Temperature	5960 ± 100 K
Metallicity [Fe/H]	+0.13 dex
Rotational velocity (v sin i)	4.3 km/s
Age	3.7 ± 0.4 Gyr

Other designations
- HIP 42723, SAO 117040, BD+05 2035, 2MASS J08422511+0434411

Database references
SIMBAD	data

HD 74156 is a yellow dwarf star (spectral type G1V) in the constellation of Hydra, 187 light years from the Solar System. It is known to be orbited by two giant planets.

== Star ==
This star is 24% more massive and 64% larger than the Sun. The total luminosity is 2.96 times that of the Sun and its temperature 5960 K. The age of the star is estimated at 3.7 billion years, with metallicity 1.35 times that of the Sun based on its abundance of iron.

== Planetary system ==
In April 2001, two giant planets were announced orbiting the star. The first planet HD 74156 b orbits the star at a distance closer than Mercury is to the Sun, in an extremely eccentric orbit. The second planet HD 74156 c is a long-period, massive planet (at least 8 times the mass of Jupiter), which orbits the star in an elliptical orbit with a semimajor axis of 3.90 astronomical units. In 2022, the inclination and true mass of HD 74156 c were measured via astrometry.

The HD 74156 planetary system
Companion (in order from star)	Mass	Semimajor axis (AU)	Orbital period (days)	Eccentricity	Inclination (°)	Radius
b	≥1.778±0.020 M_{J}	0.2916±0.0033	51.6385±0.0015	0.6380±0.0061	—	—
c	8.665+1.385 −0.470 M_{J}	3.678+0.145 −0.159	2448.5±4.2	0.377±0.006	120.162+7.601 −66.225	—

=== Claims of a third planet ===
Given the two-planet configuration of the system under the assumption that the orbits are coplanar and have masses equal to their minimum masses, an additional Saturn-mass planet would be stable in a region between 0.9 and 1.4 AU between the orbits of the two known planets. Under the "packed planetary systems" hypothesis, which predicts that planetary systems form in such a way that the system could not support additional planets between the orbits of the existing ones, the gap would be expected to host a planet.

In September 2007, a third planet with a mass at least 0.396 Jupiter masses was announced to be orbiting between planets b and c with an eccentric orbit. The planet, orbiting in a region of the planetary system previously known to be stable for additional planets, was seen as a confirmation of the "packed planetary systems" hypothesis. However, Roman V. Baluev has cast doubt on this discovery, suggesting that the observed variations may be due to annual errors in the data. A subsequent search using the Hobby-Eberly Telescope also failed to confirm the planet, and further data obtained using HIRES instrument strongly contradicts its existence.

== See also ==
- List of extrasolar planets
- HD 37124
- Upsilon Andromedae
