= HD 205739 =

Star in the constellation Piscis Austrinus

HD 205739 / Sāmaya
Observation data Epoch J2000.0 Equinox ICRS
- Constellation: Piscis Austrinus
- Right ascension: 21^{h} 38^{m} 08.40401^{s}
- Declination: −31° 44′ 14.9385″
- Apparent magnitude (V): 8.56

Characteristics
- Spectral type: F7 V
- B−V color index: 0.546±0.015

Astrometry
Radial velocity (R_{v})	+9.66±0.14 km/s
Proper motion (μ)	RA: +21.833 mas/yr Dec.: −82.314 mas/yr
Parallax (π)	10.7609±0.0203 mas
Distance	303.1 ± 0.6 ly (92.9 ± 0.2 pc)
Absolute magnitude (M_{V})	3.42

Details
Mass	1.329±0.003 M_{☉}
Radius	1.59±0.04 R_{☉}
Luminosity	3.52±0.01 L_{☉}
Surface gravity (log g)	4.15±0.02 cgs
Temperature	6,276±41 K
Metallicity [Fe/H]	0.21 dex
Rotational velocity (v sin i)	4.06 km/s
Age	2.8±0.2 Gyr

Other designations
- Samaya, CD−32° 16667, HD 205739, HIP 106824, SAO 213152, PPM 301636

Database references
SIMBAD	data
Exoplanet Archive	data

HD 205739 is a yellow-white hued star in the southern constellation of Piscis Austrinus, positioned near the western constellation boundary with Microscopium. It has the proper name Sāmaya, which was selected in the NameExoWorlds campaign by Sri Lanka, during the 100th anniversary of the IAU. Sāmaya (සාමය) means peace in the Sinhalese language.

With an apparent visual magnitude of 8.56, this star requires a small telescope to view. It is located at a distance of approximately 303 light-years from the Sun based on stellar parallax, and is drifting further away with a radial velocity of +9.7 km/s. This star has an absolute magnitude of 3.42.

HD 205739 is an ordinary F-type main-sequence star with a stellar classification of F7 V. This indicates that, like the Sun, it is generating energy through core hydrogen fusion. The star is 2.8 billion years old with an inactive chromosphere and is spinning with a projected rotational velocity of 4 km/s. It has 1.3 times the mass of the Sun and 1.6 times the Sun's radius. The abundance of iron is 60% greater than in the Sun, suggesting a higher metallicity. The star is radiating 3.5 times the luminosity of the Sun from its photosphere at an effective temperature of 6,276 K.

A Jupiter-like planet has been detected in an eccentric orbit around this star via Doppler spectroscopy. The eccentricity of 0.27 indicates that the orbit carries the body from 0.65 AU out to 1.14 AU between periastron and apastron. The maximum surface temperature of the planet is ~400 K, varying by 100 K over the course of an orbit. There is a data trend in the results which may point to an additional companion further from its star, but this will require a longer observation period to validate.

The HD 205739 planetary system
Companion (in order from star)	Mass	Semimajor axis (AU)	Orbital period (days)	Eccentricity	Inclination (°)	Radius
b / Samagiya	≥1.37 M_{J}	0.896	279.8±0.1	0.27±0.07	—	—

== See also ==
- HD 154672
