= HD 20782 =

Star in the constellation Fornax

Observation data Epoch J2000.0 Equinox ICRS
- Constellation: Fornax
- Right ascension: 03^{h} 20^{m} 03.57776^{s}
- Declination: −28° 51′ 14.6604″
- Apparent magnitude (V): 7.38

Characteristics
- Spectral type: G1.5 V
- B−V color index: +0.65

Astrometry
Radial velocity (R_{v})	40.7±0.99 km/s
Proper motion (μ)	RA: +349.054 mas/yr Dec.: −65.305 mas/yr
Parallax (π)	27.8760±0.0172 mas
Distance	117.00 ± 0.07 ly (35.87 ± 0.02 pc)
Absolute magnitude (M_{V})	+4.61

Details
Mass	0.96^{+0.02}_{−0.01} M_{☉}
Radius	1.17±0.03 R_{☉}
Luminosity	1.262^{+0.005}_{−0.006} L_{☉}
Surface gravity (log g)	4.35^{+0.05}_{−0.08} cgs
Temperature	5,741±41 K
Metallicity [Fe/H]	−0.06±0.02 dex
Rotational velocity (v sin i)	3.0±0.6 km/s
Age	8.5^{+2.5}_{−2.0} Gyr

Other designations
- CD−29°1231, CPD−29°382, HD 20782, HIP 15527, SAO 168469, WDS J03201-2851A, LTT 1582, TIC 144503325

Database references
SIMBAD	data
Exoplanet Archive	data

HD 20782 (HIP 15527; LTT 1582) is the primary of a wide binary system located in the southern constellation Fornax. It has an apparent magnitude of 7.38, making it readily visible in binoculars but not to the naked eye. The system is located relatively close at a distance of 117 light-years based on Gaia DR3 parallax measurements, but it is receding with a heliocentric radial velocity of 40.7 km/s. At its current distance, HD 20782's brightness is diminished by 0.12 magnitudes due to interstellar extinction and it has an absolute magnitude of +4.61.

== Properties ==
HD 20782 has a stellar classification of G1.5 V, indicating that it is an ordinary G-type main-sequence star like the Sun. It has also been given a cooler class of G3 V. It has 96% the mass of the Sun and 1.17 times the radius of the Sun. It radiates 1.262 times the luminosity of the Sun from its photosphere at an effective temperature of 5,741 K, which is 35 K cooler than the Sun's temperature. When viewed in the night sky. the star has a yellow hue. HD 20782 is slightly metal deficient with an iron abundance 87.1% that of the Sun's or [Fe/H] = −0.06, and it is estimated to be 8.5 billion years old, which is nearly twice of the Sun's age. It spins modestly with a projected rotational velocity of 3.0 km/s.

== Binary system ==
HD 20781 is a G or K-type main-sequence star with a very large angular separation of 252 arcsec, corresponding to 9080 AU at the distance of HD 20782. In 2011, two Neptune-mass planets were announced around the nearby HD 20781, and initially they too were believed to be in eccentric orbits, but less so. However, later more detailed observations on this system revealed not only two more planets but also that all the planets in this system, in stark contrast to HD 20782, are likely in low eccentricity orbits. The binary star system has a total of five known planets around both stars.

== Planetary system ==
An extremely eccentric extrasolar planet was announced around HD 20782 in 2006. In 2009 this planet's orbit was narrowed down, and it was found to have the highest eccentricity of all known exoplanets; this distinction has stood since 2012.

The HD 20782 planetary system
Companion (in order from star)	Mass	Semimajor axis (AU)	Orbital period (days)	Eccentricity	Inclination (°)	Radius
b	≥1.49±0.11 M_{J}	1.3649^{+0.0466}_{−0.0495}	597.065±0.043	0.956±0.004	—	—

== See also ==
- Struve 1341
- Kepler-16

Other systems with multiple planet-hosting stars:

- 55 Cancri
- HD 133131
- WASP-94
- XO-2
- Struve 2398
