= HD 37605 b =

Extrasolar planet in the constellation of Orion

Discovery
- Discovered by: Cochran et al.
- Discovery site: Hobby-Eberly Telescope
- Discovery date: 8 July 2004
- Detection method: doppler spectroscopy

Orbital characteristics
- Semi-major axis: 0.277±0.015 AU
- Eccentricity: 0.6745±0.0019
- Orbital period (sidereal): 55.01292±0.00062 d
- Time of periastron: 2463048.16±0.025
- Argument of periastron: 220.78±0.27
- Semi-amplitude: 203.47±0.75
- Star: HD 37605

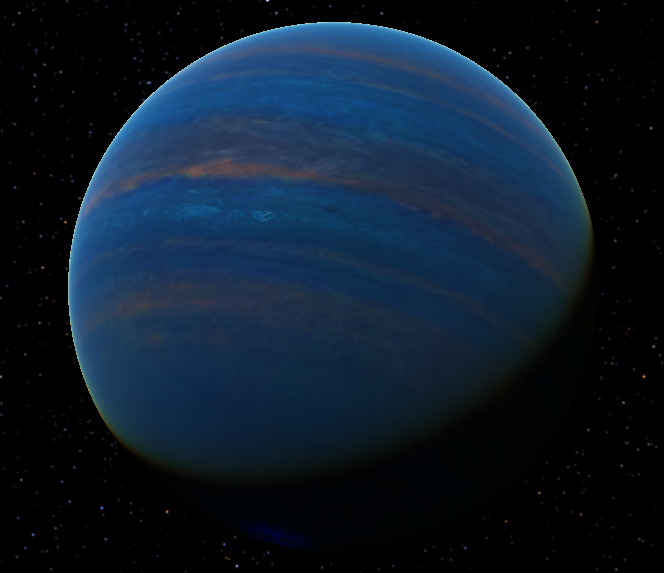
HD 37605 b

HD 37605 b is an extrasolar planet that is 2.84 times more massive than Jupiter. It orbits close to the star, taking 54 days to revolve around the parent star HD 37605. Its orbit is highly eccentric, around 74%. Distance from HD 37605 ranges from 0.069 to 0.453 astronomical units.

It is the first planet found by Hobby-Eberly Telescope (HET) in July 2004.

In a simulation, HD 37605 b's orbit "sweeps clean" most test particles within 0.5 AU; leaving only asteroids "in low-eccentricity orbits near the known planet’s apastron distance, near the 1:2 mean-motion resonance" with oscillating eccentricity up to 0.06, and also at 1:3 with oscillating eccentricity up to 0.4.
