= HD 37605 =

Star in the constellation Orion

Observation data Epoch J2000.0 Equinox ICRS
- Constellation: Orion
- Right ascension: 05^{h} 40^{m} 01.7283^{s}
- Declination: +06° 03′ 38.073″
- Apparent magnitude (V): 8.67

Characteristics
- Evolutionary stage: main sequence
- Spectral type: K0 V
- B−V color index: 0.827±0.005

Astrometry
Radial velocity (R_{v})	−22.08±0.15 km/s
Proper motion (μ)	RA: 52.246(26) mas/yr Dec.: −247.136(17) mas/yr
Parallax (π)	21.4364±0.0224 mas
Distance	152.2 ± 0.2 ly (46.65 ± 0.05 pc)
Absolute magnitude (M_{V})	5.46

Details
Mass	0.98±0.01 M_{☉}
Radius	0.89±0.01 R_{☉}
Luminosity	0.602±0.002 L_{☉}
Surface gravity (log g)	4.52±0.01 cgs
Temperature	5,380±13 K
Metallicity [Fe/H]	0.25±0.04 dex
Rotation	57.67 days
Rotational velocity (v sin i)	4.5 km/s
Age	1.8±1.0 or 7 Gyr

Other designations
- BD+05°985, HD 37605, HIP 26664, SAO 113015, LTT 11695

Database references
SIMBAD	data
Exoplanet Archive	data

HD 37605 is a star in the equatorial constellation of Orion. It is orange in hue but is too faint to be visible to the naked eye, having an apparent visual magnitude of 8.67. Parallax measurements yield a distance estimate of 152 light years from the Sun. It has a high proper motion and is drifting closer with a radial velocity of −22 km/s.

This object is a K-type main-sequence star with a stellar classification of K0 V. It is an inactive, metal-rich star. Age estimates range from 1.8 up to 7 billion years old, and it is spinning with a projected rotational velocity of 4.5 km/s. The star has 98% of the mass of the Sun and 89% of the Sun's radius. It is radiating 60% of the luminosity of the Sun from its photosphere at an effective temperature of 5,380 K.

== Planets ==
There are two giant planets known in orbit. Planet b was discovered in 2004 and planet c was discovered eight years later. The planets do not transit relative to Earth; b's maximum inclination is 88.1%.

In a simulation, HD 37605 b's orbit "sweeps clean" most test particles within 0.5 AU; leaving only asteroids "in low-eccentricity orbits near the known planet’s apastron distance, near the 1:2 mean-motion resonance" with oscillating eccentricity up to 0.06, and also at 1:3 with oscillating eccentricity up to 0.4. Also, observation has ruled out planets heavier than 0.7 Jupiter mass with a period of one year or less; which still allows for planets at 0.8 AU or more.

The HD 37605 planetary system
Companion (in order from star)	Mass	Semimajor axis (AU)	Orbital period (days)	Eccentricity	Inclination (°)	Radius
b	≥2.69±0.3 M_{J}	0.277±0.015	55.01292±0.00062	0.6745±0.0019	—	—
c	≥3.19±0.38 M_{J}	3.74±0.21	2720±15	0.03±0.012	—	—
