= HD 89744 =

Star in the constellation Ursa Major

- Location of HD 89744 (invisible beside μ UMa at this scale)

Observation data Epoch J2000.0 Equinox ICRS
- Constellation: Ursa Major
- A
- Right ascension: 10^{h} 22^{m} 10.5619^{s}
- Declination: +41° 13′ 46.310″
- Apparent magnitude (V): 5.73
- B
- Right ascension: 10^{h} 22^{m} 14.8721^{s}
- Declination: +41° 14′ 26.514″

Characteristics
- Evolutionary stage: main sequence
- Spectral type: F7V or F8IV
- B−V color index: 0.531±0.003

Astrometry

A
Radial velocity (R_{v})	−4.35±0.12 km/s
Proper motion (μ)	RA: −120.285(42) mas/yr Dec.: −138.171(50) mas/yr
Parallax (π)	25.9334±0.0436 mas
Distance	125.8 ± 0.2 ly (38.56 ± 0.06 pc)
Absolute magnitude (M_{V})	2.83

B
Proper motion (μ)	RA: −119.215(647) mas/yr Dec.: −140.390(457) mas/yr
Parallax (π)	26.0070±0.4713 mas
Distance	125 ± 2 ly (38.5 ± 0.7 pc)

Details

A
Mass	1.37±0.09 M_{☉}
Radius	2.16+0.06 −0.01 R_{☉}
Luminosity	6.38±0.02 L_{☉}
Surface gravity (log g)	4.27±0.05 cgs
Temperature	6,381±43 K
Metallicity [Fe/H]	0.30±0.03 dex
Rotation	~9 days
Rotational velocity (v sin i)	9.3 km/s
Age	8.4 Gyr

B
Mass	0.076 M_{☉}

Other designations
- BD+41°2076, GJ 9326, HD 89744, HIP 50786, HR 4067, WDS J10222+4114
- A: HD 89744A
- B: HD 89744B, 2MASS J10221489+4114266, Gaia DR3 804745827531820288

Database references
SIMBAD	A
- B
Exoplanet Archive	data
ARICNS	data

HD 89744 is a star in the northern circumpolar constellation of Ursa Major, positioned about 0.4° due south of the bright star μ UMa. This object has a yellow-white hue and is dimly visible to the naked eye with an apparent visual magnitude of 5.73. The distance to this star has been measured using the parallax method, which locates it 126 light-years from the Sun. It is drifting closer with a radial velocity of −4.4 km/s. There are two known exoplanets orbiting this star.

At various times the star HD 89744 has been assigned a stellar classification of F7V, F7IV-V, and F8IV, suggesting it is an F-type main-sequence star that is evolving onto the subgiant branch. It is ~8.4 billion years old with an inactive chromosphere and is spinning with a projected rotational velocity of 9.3 km/s. The star is 2.16 times the size of the Sun with 1.4 times the Sun's radius. It is a high metallicity star, showing a greater abundance of heavier elements than in the Sun. The star is radiating 6.4 times the luminosity of the Sun from its photosphere at an effective temperature of 6,381 K.

This star was identified as a member of the AB Doradus moving group by J. López-Santiago and collaborators in 2006. It was later shown that its evolutionary state is incompatible with membership.

In 2001, a faint co-moving companion was identified at an angular separation of 63.1″ from the primary. This is equivalent to a linear projected separation of 2,456 AU (0.04 ly). The companion, designated component B, is an L-class (~L0.5) brown dwarf with a mass of ~0.076 M_{☉}.

== Planetary system ==
In April 2000, a planet was discovered using radial velocity measurements taken at Fred Lawrence Whipple Observatory and Lick Observatory. The orbital parameters were updated in 2006 and 2007 using additional measurements. A second candidate planet with a much longer period was discovered in 2019.

The HD 89744 planetary system
Companion (in order from star)	Mass	Semimajor axis (AU)	Orbital period (days)	Eccentricity	Inclination (°)	Radius
b	>8.35±0.18 M_{J}	0.917±0.009	256.78±0.02	0.677±0.003	—	—
c (unconfirmed)	>5.36±4.57 M_{J}	8.3±1.8	6,974±2,161	0.29±0.12	—	—

== See also ==
- List of exoplanets discovered before 2000 - HD 89744 b
