= HD 80606 and HD 80607 =

Binary star system in the constellation Ursa Major

HD 80606/7
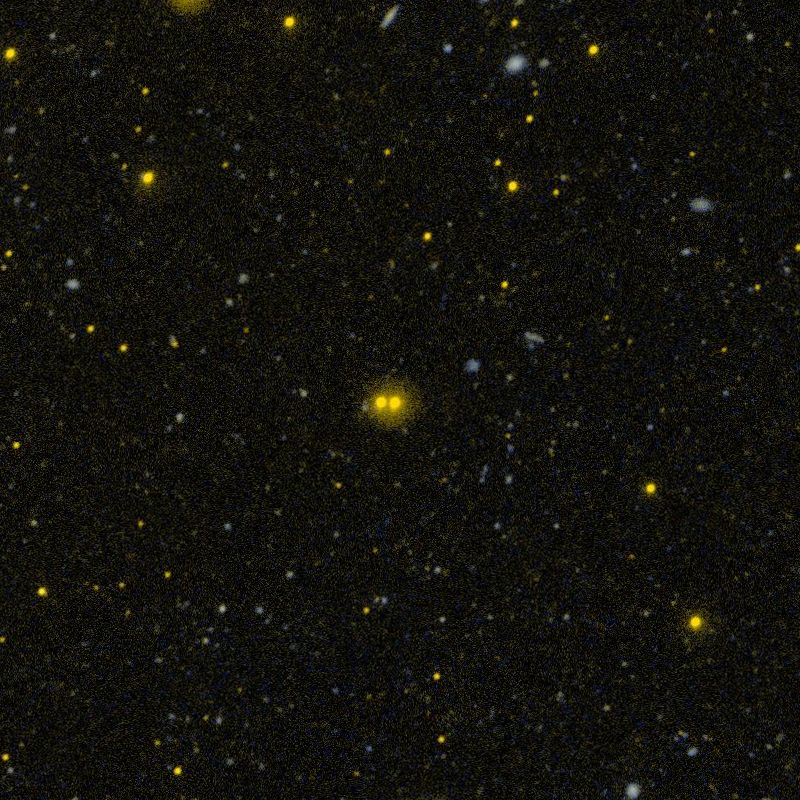
- The HD 80606/7 binary star system on GALEX sky survey

Observation data Epoch J2000.0 Equinox ICRS
- Constellation: Ursa Major
- HD 80606
- Right ascension: 09^{h} 22^{m} 37.5769^{s}
- Declination: +50° 36′ 13.430″
- Apparent magnitude (V): +9.00
- HD 80607
- Right ascension: 09^{h} 22^{m} 39.7369^{s}
- Declination: +50° 36′ 13.945″
- Apparent magnitude (V): +9.090

Characteristics

HD 80606
- Evolutionary stage: main sequence
- Spectral type: G8V
- B−V color index: +0.765

HD 80607
- Evolutionary stage: main sequence
- Spectral type: G8V
- B−V color index: +0.828

Astrometry

HD 80606
Radial velocity (R_{v})	3.6 km/s
Proper motion (μ)	RA: +56.022 mas/yr Dec.: +10.331 mas/yr
Parallax (π)	15.1439±0.0170 mas
Distance	215.4 ± 0.2 ly (66.03 ± 0.07 pc)
Absolute magnitude (M_{V})	+5.02

HD 80607
Radial velocity (R_{v})	3.3 km/s
Proper motion (μ)	RA: +52.656 mas/yr Dec.: +9.938 mas/yr
Parallax (π)	15.1482±0.0157 mas
Distance	215.3 ± 0.2 ly (66.01 ± 0.07 pc)
Absolute magnitude (M_{V})	+5.11

Details

HD 80606
Mass	1.05 M_{☉}
Radius	1.05±0.01 R_{☉}
Luminosity	0.9 L_{☉}
Surface gravity (log g)	4.50±0.20 cgs
Temperature	5,395 K
Metallicity [Fe/H]	0.43±0.06 dex
Rotational velocity (v sin i)	0.9±0.6 km/s
Age	11.4 Gyr

HD 80607
Mass	1.0 M_{☉}
Radius	1.0 R_{☉}
Luminosity	0.8 L_{☉}
Surface gravity (log g)	4.52±0.15 cgs
Temperature	5,420 K
Metallicity [Fe/H]	0.38±0.06 dex
Rotational velocity (v sin i)	1.4±0.4 km/s
Age	8.1 Gyr

Other designations
- BD+51°1500, CCDM J09226+5036, WDS J09226+5036, STF 1341
- HD 80606: HIP 45982, SAO 27230
- HD 80607: HIP 45983

Database references
SIMBAD	HD 80606
- HD 80607
Exoplanet Archive	data

HD 80606 and HD 80607 are two stars comprising a binary star system. They are 215 light-years away in the constellation of Ursa Major. Both stars orbit each other at an average distance of 1,200 astronomical units. The binary system is listed as Struve 1341 in the Struve Catalogue of Double Stars; however, this designation is not in wide use and the system is usually referred to by the HD designations of its constituent stars. An extrasolar planet has been confirmed to orbit HD 80606 in a highly elliptical orbit.

== Stellar system ==
The binary system components are very similar G-type main-sequence stars with similar properties to the Sun, although both are older than the Sun and approaching the very end of their main sequence lives.

== Planetary system ==
The orbital motion of HD 80606 b

The variable radial velocity of HD 80606 was first noticed in 1999 from observations with the 10 m Keck 1 telescope at the W. M. Keck Observatory in Hawaii by the G-Dwarf Planet Search, a survey of nearly 1,000 nearby G dwarfs to identify extrasolar planet candidates. The star was then followed up by the Geneva Extrasolar Planet Search team using the ELODIE spectrograph mounted on the 1.93 m telescope at the Haute-Provence Observatory. The discovery of HD 80606 b was announced on April 4, 2001. Its orbit is misaligned with the star's rotation at 53 degrees. Additional studies using the Spitzer Space Telescope in the infrared, and the Very Large Array in the millimeter radio, have shown that the highly eccentric planet 'b' orbiting HD 80606 grazes the parent star at its closest passage to produce difficult-to-detect stellar lobing, severe 'space weather', aurorae and other non-thermal activity. At the time, its orbit was the most eccentric orbit of any extrasolar planet known. (Note: Since then, HD 20782 b has been found, with an eccentricity of 0.97.) It has an eccentricity of 0.9336, comparable to that of Comet Halley in the Solar System. The eccentricity may be a result of the Kozai mechanism, which would occur if the planet's orbit is significantly inclined to that of the binary stars. This conclusion is reinforced by the detection of the misalignment, an expected result of the Kozai mechanism.

In a simulation of a ten-million-year span, the planet "sweeps clean" most test particles within 1.75 AU of HD 80606. The 8:1 resonance hollows out another Kirkwood gap at 1.9 AU. There cannot be any habitable planets in this system. Also, observation has ruled out planets heavier than 0.7 Jupiter masses with a period of one year or less.

The HD 80606 planetary system
Companion (in order from star)	Mass	Semimajor axis (AU)	Orbital period (days)	Eccentricity	Inclination (°)	Radius
b	4.1641±0.0047 M_{J}	0.4603±0.0021	111.436765(74)	0.93183(14)	89.24±0.01	1.032±0.015 R_{J}

== See also ==
- Gliese 752
- HD 20782
- Iota Horologii
