= HD 20782 b =

Extrasolar planet in the constellation Fornax

Discovery
- Discovered by: Jones et al.
- Discovery site: Anglo-Australian Planet Search
- Discovery date: March 14, 2006
- Detection method: Radial velocity

Orbital characteristics
- Semi-major axis: 1.36 ± 0.12 AU (203,000,000 ± 18,000,000 km)
- Eccentricity: 0.97 ± 0.01
- Orbital period (sidereal): 585.86 ± 0.03 d
- Time of periastron: 2451687.1 ± 2.5
- Argument of periastron: 147 ± 3
- Semi-amplitude: 115 ± 12
- Star: HD 20782

HD 20782 b is an extrasolar planet located approximately 117 light-years away in the constellation of Fornax, orbiting the star HD 20782.

This planet orbits in the most eccentric orbit known (as of November 2012), with a semi-major axis of 1.36 AU, and eccentricity of 0.97±0.01. As a result, it also has one of the most extreme temperature swings.

== See also ==
- HD 80606 b
