= HD 80606 b =

Eccentric hot Jupiter in the constellation Ursa Major

- Computer simulation of weather systems on HD 80606 b, to scale with Jupiter

Discovery
- Discovered by: Geneva Extrasolar Planet Search
- Discovery site: Haute-Provence Observatory
- Discovery date: 4 April 2001
- Detection method: Radial velocity

Orbital characteristics
- Apastron: 0.8892 AU (133,020,000 km)
- Periastron: 0.03138 AU (4,694,000 km)
- Semi-major axis: 0.4603 ± 0.0021 AU (68,860,000 ± 310,000 km)
- Eccentricity: 0.93183±0.00014
- Orbital period (sidereal): 111.436765±0.000074 d
- Inclination: 89.24°±0.01°
- Time of periastron: 2458882.344±0.0021 BJD
- Argument of periastron: −58.887°±0.043°
- Semi-amplitude: 469.22±0.61 m/s
- Star: HD 80606

Physical characteristics
- Mean radius: 1.032±0.015 R_{J}
- Mass: 4.1641±0.0047 M_{J}
- Mean density: 5.06+0.38 −0.35 g/cm^{3}
- Surface gravity: 9.6 g
- Synodic rotation period: 93+85 −35 h
- Temperature: <500 - 1400 K

HD 80606 b (also known as Struve 1341 Bb or HIP 45982 b) is an eccentric hot Jupiter 217 light-years from the Sun in the constellation of Ursa Major. HD 80606 b was discovered orbiting the star HD 80606 in April 2001 by a team led by Michel Mayor and Didier Queloz. With a mass 4 times that of Jupiter, it is a gas giant. Because the planet transits the host star its radius can be determined using the transit method, and was found to be about the same as Jupiter's, its density is slightly less than Earth's. It has an extremely eccentric orbit like a comet, with its orbit taking it very close to its star and then back out very far away from it every 111 days.

== Discovery ==
The variable radial velocity of HD 80606 was first noticed in 1999 from observations with the 10-m Keck 1 telescope at the W. M. Keck Observatory in Hawaii by the G-Dwarf Planet Search, a survey of nearly 1000 nearby G dwarfs to identify extrasolar planet candidates. The star was then followed up by the Geneva Extrasolar Planet Search team using the ELODIE spectrograph mounted on the 1.93-m telescope at the Haute-Provence Observatory. The discovery of HD 80606 b was announced on 4 April 2001.

The transit was detected using a Celestron 35-cm Schmidt–Cassegrain telescope at the UCL Observatory. Prior to the large data release of the Kepler Mission in February 2011, HD 80606 b had the longest orbital period of any known transiting planet. It takes 12.1 hours to transit its star.

The transit of 14 January 2010 was partially observed by MOST; but there were equipment failures over part of this time, and the 8 January secondary transit was entirely lost. The midpoint of the next transit was 1 February 2013 11:37 UT.

== Physical properties ==
Orbital motion of HD 80606 b.

HD 80606 b – animation (01:28) (28 March 2016).

HD 80606 b has the most eccentric orbit of any known planet after HD 20782 b. Its eccentricity is ~0.9318, comparable to Halley's Comet. The eccentricity may be a result of the Kozai mechanism, which would occur if the planet's orbit is significantly inclined to that of the binary stars. This interpretation is supported by measurements of the Rossiter–McLaughlin effect, which indicate that the planet's orbit may be significantly inclined (by 42±8°) to the rotational axis of the star, a configuration which would be expected if the Kozai mechanism were responsible for the orbit.

As a result of this high eccentricity, the planet's distance from its star varies from 0.03 to 0.88 AU. At apastron it would receive an insolation similar to that of Earth, while at periastron the insolation would be around 800 times greater, far more than that experienced by Mercury in the Solar System. In 2009, the eclipse of HD 80606 b by its parent star was detected, allowing measurements of the planet's temperature to be made as the planet passed through periastron. These measurements indicated that the temperature rose from around 800 K (527 °C; 980 °F) to 1,500 K (1,230 °C; 2,240 °F) in just 6 hours.

An observer above the cloud tops of the gas giant would see the parent star swell to 30 times the apparent size of the Sun in our own sky.

The planet's rotation period has been measured to be 93+85
−35 hours, longer than the predicted pseudo-synchronous rotation period of 40 hours.

== Weather ==
The planet has wild variations in its weather as it orbits its parent star. Computer models predict the planet heats up 555 K (280 °C; 540 °F) in just a matter of hours, triggering "shock wave storms" that ripple out from the point facing its star, with winds that move at around 5 kilometres per second (3.1 mi/s; 11,000 mph).
