= N2K Consortium =

The N2K Consortium is a collaborative multinational effort by American, Chilean and Japanese astronomers to find additional extrasolar planets around stars that are not already being surveyed. The N2K is shorthand for the set of roughly 2,000 of the nearest and most luminous main sequence stars that were selected to be newly surveyed. Target stars have a B - V color index value between 0.4 and 1.2, a visual magnitude brighter than 10.5, and a distance of less than 110 pc from the Sun. They were selected based upon their high metallicity, which is the abundance of elements other than hydrogen and helium.

The observing campaign uses the Keck, Magellan and Subaru telescopes, plus automated telescopes at Fairborn Observatory. Each star is observed three times over a period of several days, then checked for short period variations in radial velocity. This variation is a characteristic of gravitational perturbation caused by a hot Jupiter. Those stars showing radial velocity variations are then checked with the automated photometric telescopes from Fairborn Observatory.

During a two-year run beginning in 2004, the N2K Consortium was predicted to detect about 60 new hot Jupiters. However, by 2009, only seven planets with orbital periods of up to five days had been discovered. They orbit the following stars:

- HD 33283
- Bibha
- HD 88133
- HD 109749
- Ogma
- Rosalíadecastro
- Axólotl

== See also ==
- List of astronomical societies
