= Magellan Telescopes =

Optical telescopes located at Las Campanas Observatory in Chile

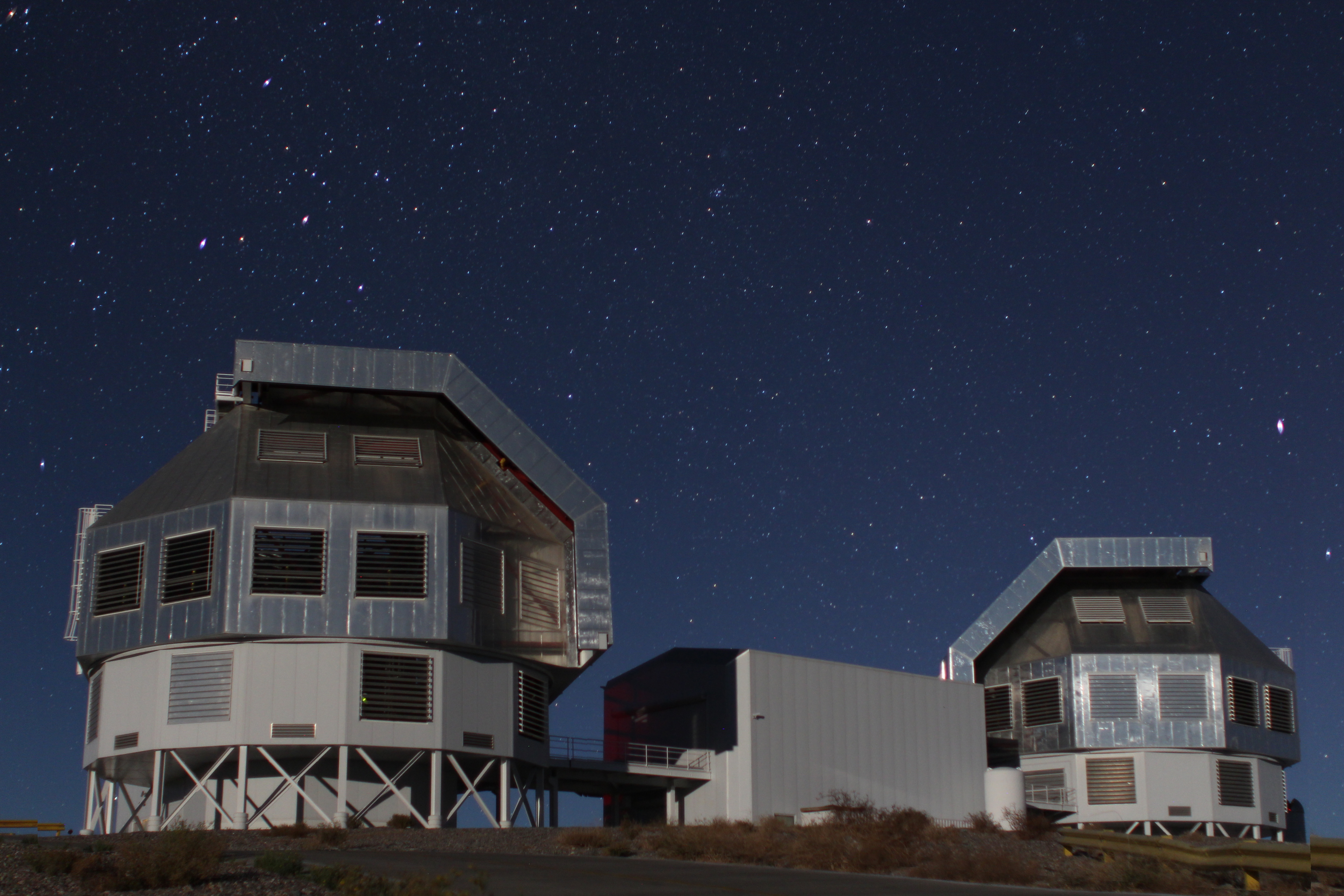
- Alternative names: Walter Baade Magellan 6.5-m telescope (LCO)
- Location(s): Atacama Region, Chile
- Coordinates: 29°00′54″S 70°41′30″W
- Altitude: 2,516, 2,392 m (8,255, 7,848 ft)
- Diameter: 6.5 m (21 ft 4 in)
- Location of Magellan Telescopes
- Related media on Commons

The Magellan Telescopes are a pair of 6.5-metre-diameter (21 ft) optical telescopes located at Las Campanas Observatory in Chile. The two telescopes are named after the astronomer Walter Baade and the philanthropist Landon T. Clay. First light for the telescopes was on September 15, 2000 for the Baade, and September 7, 2002 for the Clay. A consortium consisting of the Carnegie Institution for Science, University of Arizona, Harvard University, the University of Michigan and the Massachusetts Institute of Technology built and operate the twin telescopes. The telescopes were named after the sixteenth-century Portuguese explorer Ferdinand Magellan.

The Giant Magellan Telescope (GMT) is an extremely large telescope under construction, as part of the US Extremely Large Telescope Program.

== Current instruments on the Magellan Telescopes ==
Baade telescope:

- Inamori Magellan Areal Camera and Spectrograph (IMACS)
- FourStar
- Folded port InfraRed Echellette (FIRE)
- Magellan Echellete (MagE)

Clay telescope:

- Magellan Inamori Kyocera Echelle (MIKE) spectrograph
- Low-Dispersion Survey Spectrograph-3 (LDSS-3)
- Megacam imager
- MagAO-X
- Michigan/Magellan Fiber System (M2FS)

== Magellan Planet Search Program ==
This program is a survey of stars searching for planets using the MIKE echelle spectrograph mounted on the 6.5 m Magellan II (Clay) telescope.

== MagAO Adaptive Optics System ==
In 2013, Clay (Magellan II) was equipped with an adaptive secondary mirror called MagAO which allowed it to take the sharpest visible-light images to date, capable of resolving objects 0.02 arcseconds across—equivalent to a dime (1.8 cm) seen from 100 miles (160 km) away.

MagAO was originally intended for the Large Binocular Telescope (LBT), but the secondary mirror was damaged before it could be installed. The project leader Laird Close and his team were able to repair and repurpose the broken mirror for use on Magellan II. As built for the LBT, the original MagAO mirror had a diameter of 36 inches (0.91 m). However, the edge of the mirror was broken. Technicians at Steward Observatory were able to cut the mirror to 33.5 inches (0.85 m) in diameter, thereby removing the broken edge.

== Gallery ==
Comparison of nominal sizes of apertures of the Magellan Telescopes and some notable optical telescopes

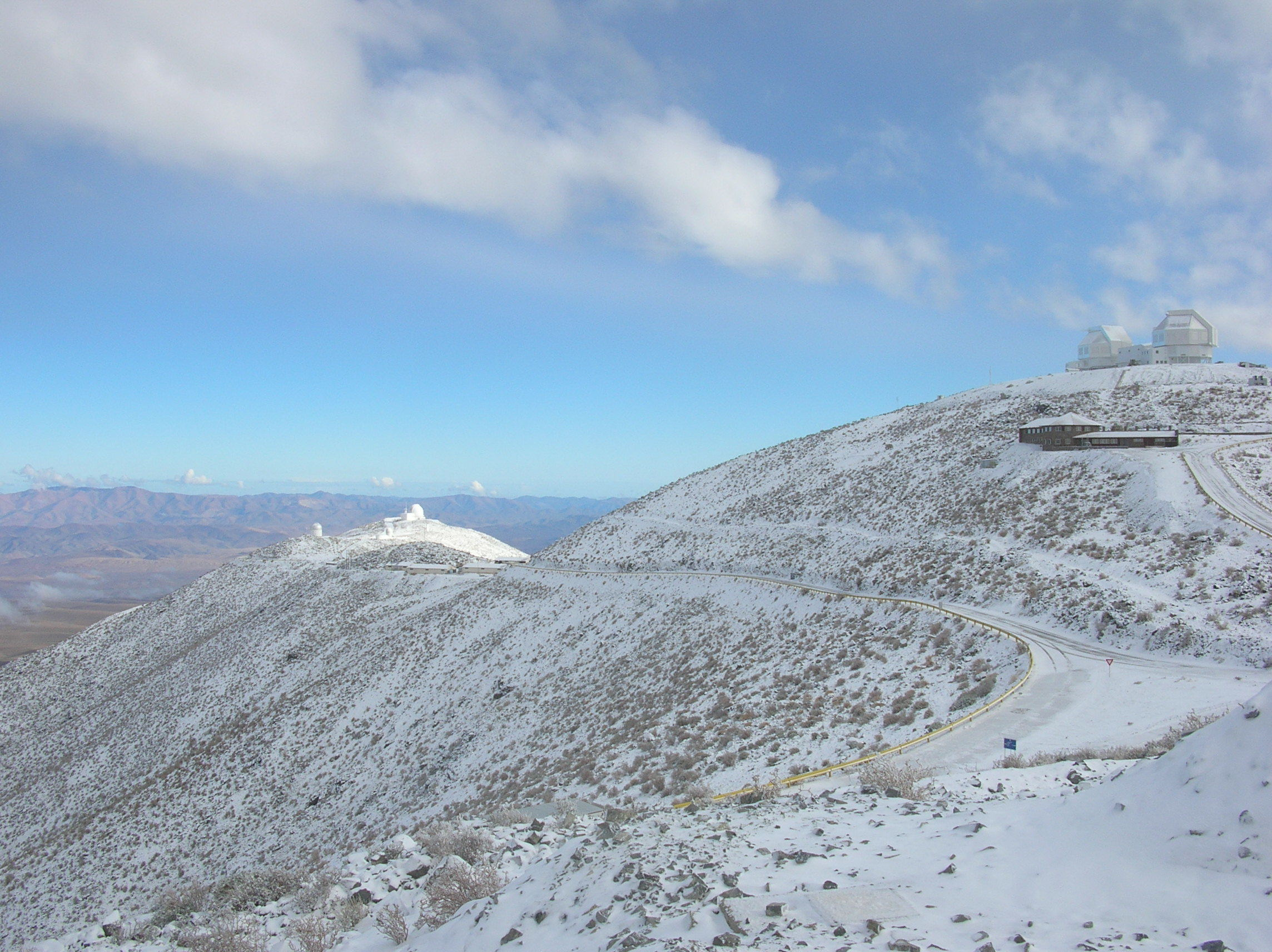
Part of Las Campanas Observatory after snowfall, with the Magellan telescopes at the right.

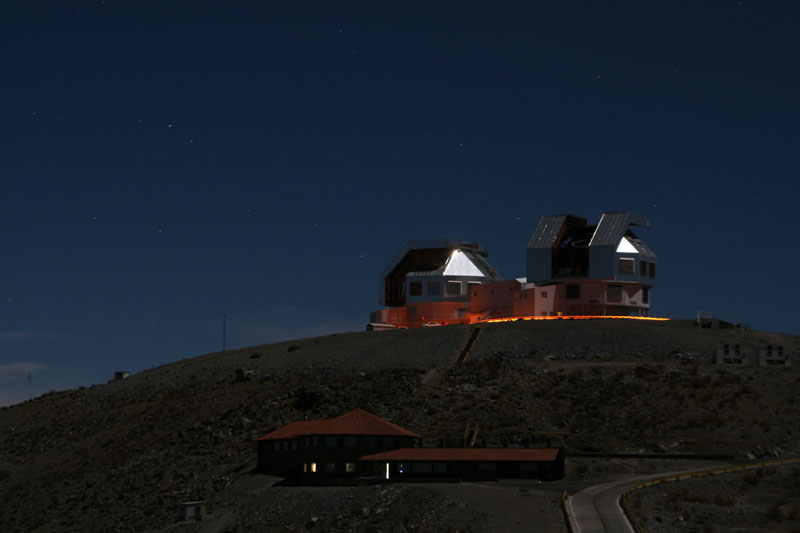
Telescopes at night

== See also ==
- List of largest optical reflecting telescopes
- Giant Magellan Telescope
- Gran Telescopio Canarias
