= Exoplanet =

Planet outside of the Solar System

Four exoplanets of the HR 8799 system imaged by the W. M. Keck Observatory over the course of seven years. Motion is interpolated from annual observations.

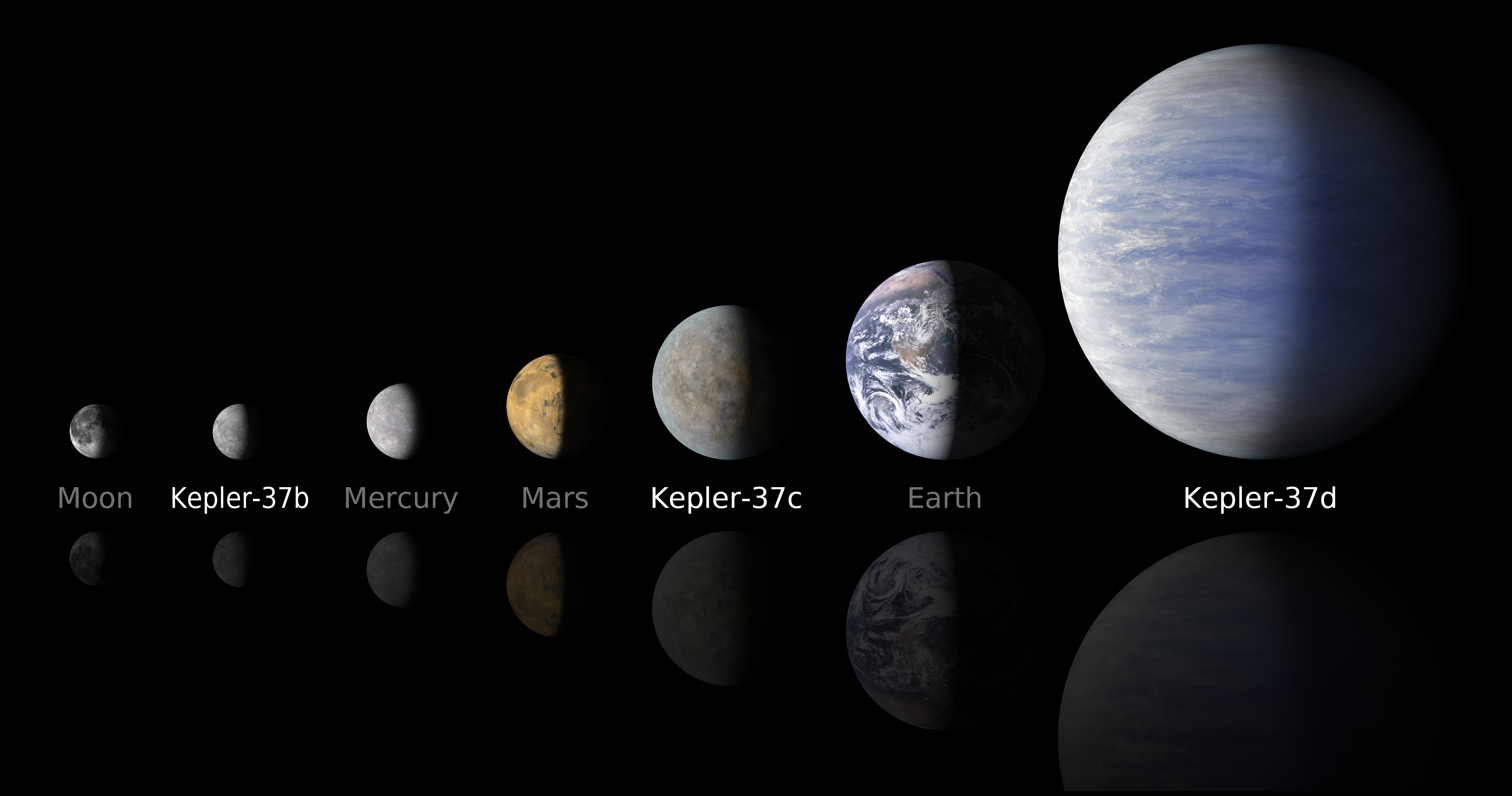
Comparison of the size of exoplanets orbiting Kepler-37 to Mercury, Mars and Earth

An exoplanet or extrasolar planet is a planet outside the Solar System. The first confirmed detection of an exoplanet was in 1992 around a pulsar, and the first detection around a main-sequence star was in 1995. A different planet, first detected in 1988, was confirmed in 2003. In 2016, it was recognized that the first possible evidence of an exoplanet had been noted in 1917, a precovery. As of 5 November 2026, there are 6,464 confirmed exoplanets in 4,849 planetary systems, with 1,074 systems having more than one planet.

There are many methods of detecting exoplanets. Transit photometry and Doppler spectroscopy have found the most, but these methods suffer from a clear observational bias favoring the detection of large planets close to the star. About 1 in 5 Sun-like stars (Note: For the purpose of this 1 in 5 statistic, "Sun-like" means G-type star. Data for Sun-like stars was not available so this statistic is an extrapolation from data about K-type stars.) are estimated to have an "Earth-sized" (Note: For the purpose of this 1 in 5 statistic, Earth-sized means 1–2 Earth radii.) planet in the habitable zone. (Note: For the purpose of this 1 in 5 statistic, "habitable zone" means the region with 0.25 to 4 times Earth's stellar flux (corresponding to 0.5–2 AU for the Sun).) Assuming there are 200 billion stars in the Milky Way, (Note: About 1/4 of stars are GK Sun-like stars. The number of stars in the galaxy is not accurately known, but assuming 200 billion stars in total, the Milky Way would have about 50 billion Sun-like (GK) stars, of which about 1 in 5 (22%) or 11 billion would have Earth-sized planets in the habitable zone. Including red dwarfs would increase this to 40 billion.) it can be hypothesized that there are 11 billion potentially habitable Earth-sized planets in the Milky Way, rising to 40 billion if planets orbiting the numerous red dwarfs are included.

The least massive exoplanet known is Draugr, which is about twice the mass of the Moon. The most massive exoplanet listed on the NASA Exoplanet Archive is HR 2562 b, about 30 times the mass of Jupiter. However, according to some definitions of a planet (based on the nuclear fusion of deuterium), it is too massive to be a planet and might be a brown dwarf. Known orbital times for exoplanets vary from less than an hour (for those closest to their star) to thousands of years. Some exoplanets are so far away from the star that it is difficult to tell whether they are gravitationally bound to it.

The nearest exoplanets are located 4.2 light-years (1.3 parsecs) from Earth and orbit Proxima Centauri, the closest star to the Sun. At the other extreme, there is evidence for extragalactic planets – exoplanets located in other galaxies.

The discovery of exoplanets has intensified interest in the search for extraterrestrial life. There is special interest in planets that orbit in a star's habitable zone (sometimes called "goldilocks zone"), where it is possible for liquid water, a prerequisite for life as we know it, to exist on the surface. However, the study of planetary habitability also considers a wide range of other factors in determining the suitability of a planet for hosting life. In collaboration with ground-based and other space-based observatories, the James Webb Space Telescope (JWST) is expected to give more insight into exoplanet traits, such as their composition, environmental conditions, and habitability.

Rogue planets are those that are not in planetary systems. Such objects are generally considered in a separate category from planets, especially if they are gas giants, often counted as sub-brown dwarfs. The number of rogue planets in the Milky Way is possibly in the billions.

== Definition ==
=== IAU ===
The official definition of the term planet used by the International Astronomical Union (IAU) only covers the Solar System and thus does not apply to exoplanets. The IAU Working Group on Extrasolar Planets issued a position statement containing a working definition of "planet" in 2001 and which was modified in 2003. An exoplanet was defined by the following criteria:

- Objects with true masses below the limiting mass for thermonuclear fusion of deuterium (currently calculated to be 13 Jupiter masses for objects of solar metallicity) that orbit stars or stellar remnants are "planets" (no matter how they formed). The minimum mass/size required for an extrasolar object to be considered a planet should be the same as that used in the Solar System.
- Substellar objects with true masses above the limiting mass for thermonuclear fusion of deuterium are "brown dwarfs", no matter how they formed or where they are located.
- Free-floating objects in young star clusters with masses below the limiting mass for thermonuclear fusion of deuterium are not "planets", but are "sub-brown dwarfs" (or whatever name is most appropriate).

This working definition was amended by the IAU's Commission F2: Exoplanets and the Solar System in August 2018. The official working definition of an exoplanet is now as follows:

- Objects with true masses below the limiting mass for thermonuclear fusion of deuterium (currently calculated to be 13 Jupiter masses for objects of solar metallicity) that orbit stars, brown dwarfs or stellar remnants and that have a mass ratio with the central object below the L_{4}/L_{5} instability (M/M_{central} < 2/(25+√621)) are "planets" (no matter how they formed).
- The minimum mass and size required for an extrasolar object to be considered a planet should be the same as that used in our Solar System.

=== Alternatives ===
The IAU's working definition is not always used. One alternate suggestion is that planets should be distinguished from brown dwarfs on the basis of their formation. It is widely thought that giant planets form through core accretion, which may sometimes produce planets with masses above the deuterium fusion threshold; massive planets of that sort may have already been observed. Brown dwarfs form like stars from the direct gravitational collapse of clouds of gas, and this formation mechanism also produces objects that are below the 13 M_{Jup} limit and can be as low as 1 M_{Jup}. Objects in this mass range that orbit their stars with wide separations of hundreds or thousands of astronomical units (AU) and have large star/object mass ratios likely formed as brown dwarfs; their atmospheres would likely have a composition more similar to their host star than accretion-formed planets, which would contain increased abundances of heavier elements. Most directly imaged planets as of April 2014 are massive and have wide orbits so probably represent the low-mass end of a brown dwarf formation. One study suggests that objects above 10 M_{Jup} formed through gravitational instability and should not be thought of as planets.

Also, the 13-Jupiter-mass cutoff does not have a precise physical significance. Deuterium fusion can occur in some objects with a mass below that cutoff. The amount of deuterium fused depends to some extent on the composition of the object. In 2011, the Extrasolar Planets Encyclopaedia included objects up to 25 Jupiter masses, saying, "The fact that there is no special feature around 13 M_{Jup} in the observed mass spectrum reinforces the choice to forget this mass limit". As of 2016, this limit was increased to 60 Jupiter masses based on a study of mass–density relationships. The Exoplanet Data Explorer includes objects up to 24 Jupiter masses with the advisory: "The 13 Jupiter-mass distinction by the IAU Working Group is physically unmotivated for planets with rocky cores, and observationally problematic due to the sin i ambiguity." The NASA Exoplanet Archive includes objects with a mass (or minimum mass) equal to or less than 30 Jupiter masses. Another criterion for separating planets and brown dwarfs, rather than deuterium fusion, formation process or location, is whether the core pressure is dominated by Coulomb pressure or electron degeneracy pressure with the dividing line at around 5 Jupiter masses.

=== Confirmation ===
An exoplanet is confirmed for NASA's Exoplanet Archive either when "different observation techniques reveal features that can only be explained by a planet" or by analytical techniques. For the Extrasolar Planets Encyclopedia, "A planet is considered as Confirmed if it is claimed unambiguously in an accepted paper or a professional conference."

== Nomenclature ==
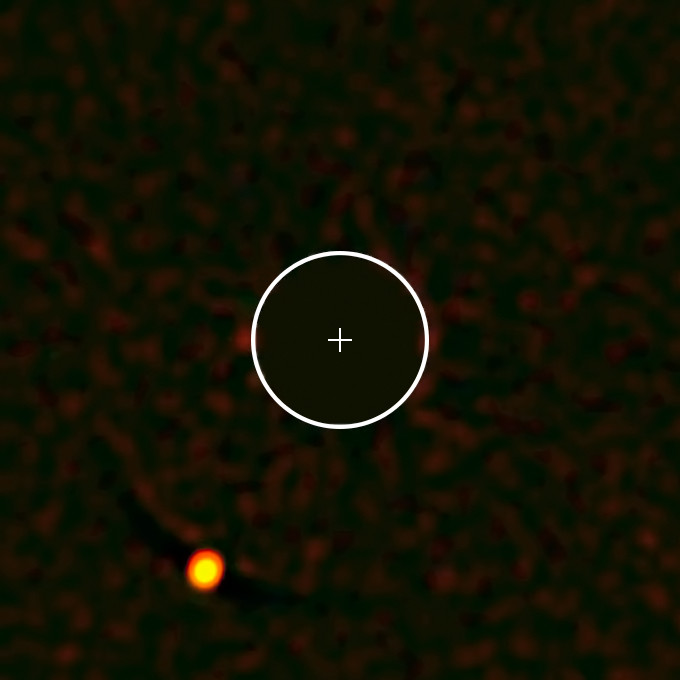
Exoplanet HIP 65426b is the first discovered planet around star HIP 65426.

The convention for naming exoplanets is an extension of the system used for designating multiple-star systems as adopted by the International Astronomical Union (IAU). For exoplanets orbiting a single star, the IAU designation is formed by taking the designated or proper name of its parent star, and adding a lower case letter. Letters are given in order of each planet's discovery around the parent star, so that the first planet discovered in a system is designated "b" (the parent star is considered "a") and later planets are given subsequent letters. If several planets in the same system are discovered at the same time, the closest one to the star gets the next letter, followed by the other planets in order of orbital size. A provisional IAU-sanctioned standard exists to accommodate the designation of circumbinary planets. A limited number of exoplanets have IAU-sanctioned proper names. Other naming systems exist.

== History of detection ==
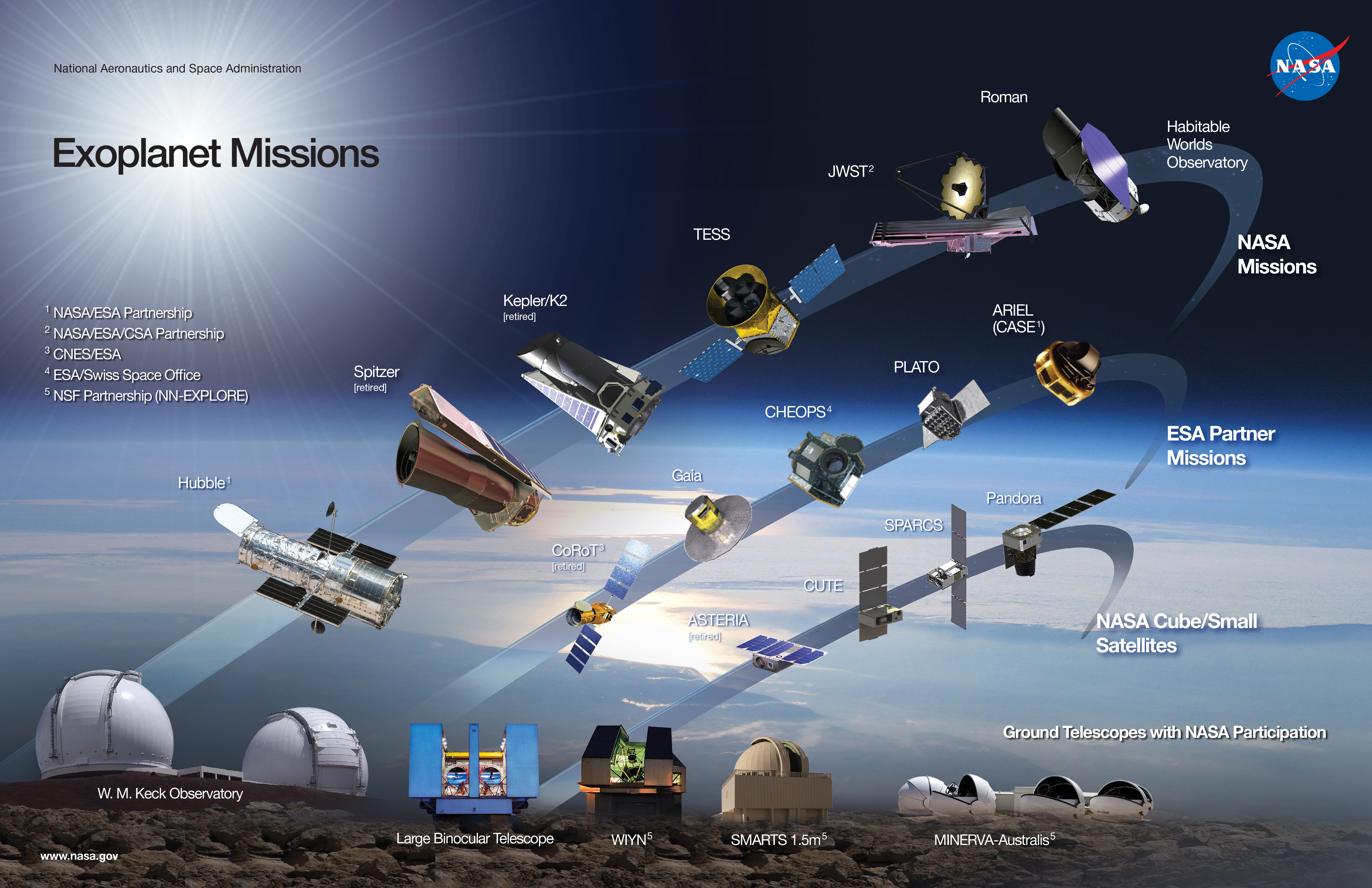
NASA graphic of present and future exoplanet missions as of 2022.

The first evidence of a possible exoplanet, orbiting Van Maanen 2, was recorded in 1917, but was not recognized as such until 2016. The astronomer Walter Sydney Adams produced a spectrum of the star using Mount Wilson's 60-inch telescope which he interpreted the spectrum to be of an F-type main-sequence star. This spectrum was reexamined during studies of white dwarf stars with unpredicted compositions. It is now thought that such a spectrum could be caused by the residue of a nearby exoplanet that had been pulverized by the gravity of the star, the resulting dust then falling onto the star.

Numerous other claims of discovery took place in the mid 20th century, involving 61 Cygni, Lalande 21185, and Barnard's Star, which were not discredited until the mid to late 1970s (see Discredited claims below). Another suspected scientific detection of an exoplanet occurred in 1988. Shortly afterwards, the first detection that is currently accepted came in 1992 when Aleksander Wolszczan and Dale Frail announced the discovery of two terrestrial-mass planets orbiting the millisecond pulsar PSR B1257+12. The first confirmation of an exoplanet orbiting a main-sequence star was made in 1995, when a giant planet was found in a four-day orbit around the nearby star 51 Pegasi. Some exoplanets have been imaged directly by telescopes, but the vast majority have been detected through indirect methods, such as the transit method and the radial-velocity method.

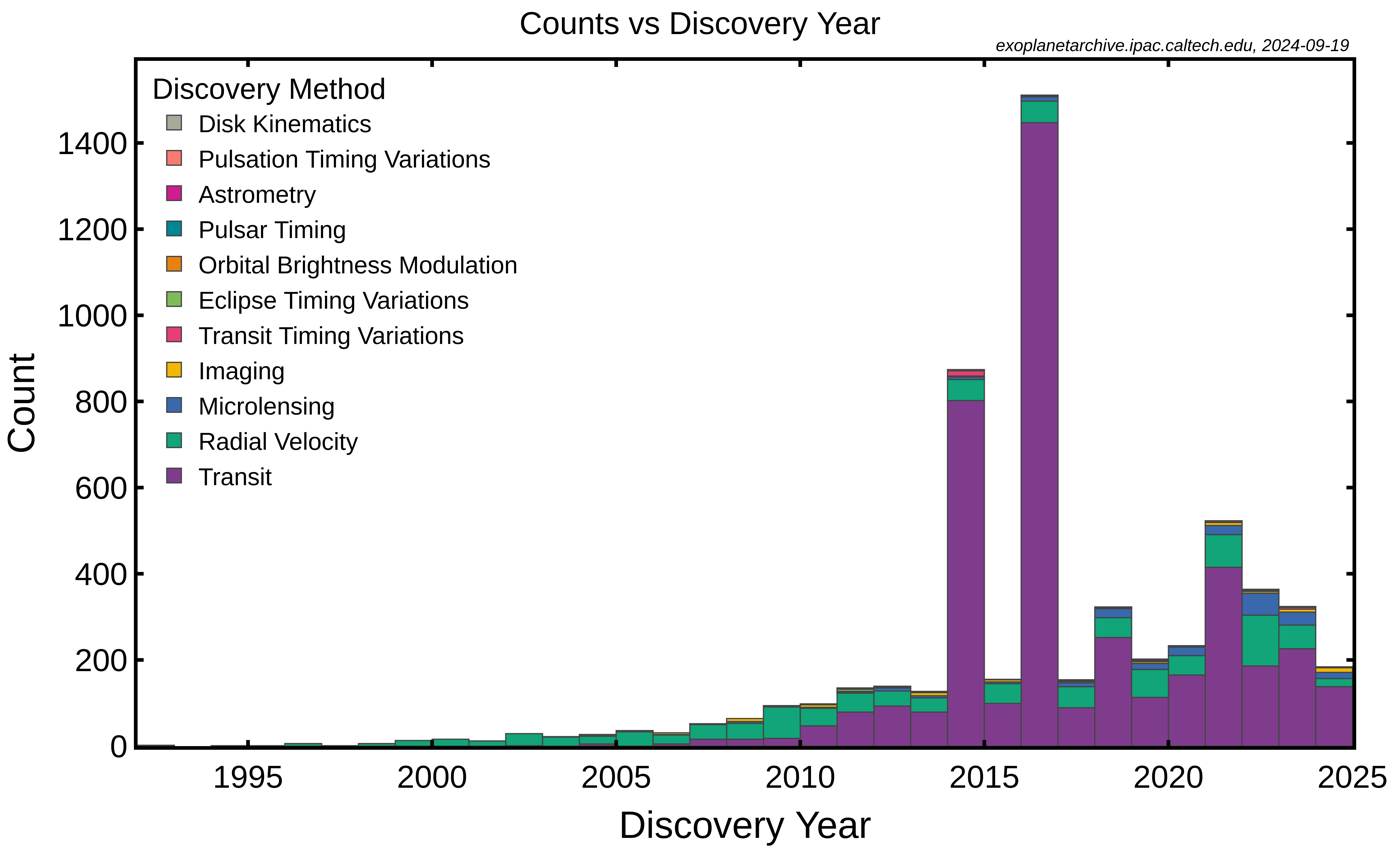
Exoplanet detections per year as of September 2024

In February 2018, researchers using the Chandra X-ray Observatory, combined with a planet detection technique called microlensing, found evidence of planets in a distant galaxy, stating, "Some of these exoplanets are as (relatively) small as the moon, while others are as massive as Jupiter. Unlike Earth, most of the exoplanets are not tightly bound to stars, so they're actually wandering through space or loosely orbiting between stars. We can estimate that the number of planets in this [faraway] galaxy is more than a trillion."

=== Early speculations ===
This space we declare to be infinite... In it are an infinity of worlds of the same kind as our own.

— Giordano Bruno (1584)

In the 16th century, the Italian philosopher Giordano Bruno, an early supporter of the Copernican theory that Earth and other planets orbit the Sun (heliocentrism), put forward the view that fixed stars are similar to the Sun and are likewise accompanied by planets.

In the 18th century, the same possibility was mentioned by Isaac Newton in the "General Scholium" that concludes his Principia. Making a comparison to the Sun's planets, he wrote "And if the fixed stars are the centres of similar systems, they will all be constructed according to a similar design and subject to the dominion of One."

In 1938, D.Belorizky demonstrated that it was realistic to search for exo-Jupiters by using transit photometry.

In 1952, more than 40 years before the first hot Jupiter was discovered, Otto Struve wrote that there is no compelling reason that planets could not be much closer to their parent star than is the case in the Solar System, and proposed that Doppler spectroscopy and the transit method could detect super-Jupiters in short orbits.

=== Discredited claims ===
Claims of exoplanet detections have been made since the nineteenth century. Some of the earliest involve the binary star 70 Ophiuchi. In 1855, William Stephen Jacob at the East India Company's Madras Observatory reported that orbital anomalies made it "highly probable" that there was a "planetary body" in this system. In the 1890s, Thomas J. J. See of the University of Chicago and the United States Naval Observatory stated that the orbital anomalies proved the existence of a dark body in the 70 Ophiuchi system with a 36-year period around one of the stars. However, Forest Ray Moulton published a paper proving that a three-body system with those orbital parameters would be highly unstable.

Multiple claims have been made that 61 Cygni might have a planetary system. Kaj Strand of the Sproul Observatory in 1942 observed tiny but systematic variations in the orbital motions of 61 Cygni A and B, suggesting that a third body of about 16 Jupiter masses must be orbiting 61 Cygni A. Multiple further claims were made, but more recent observations have yet to find confirmation. More information at 61 Cygni § Claims of a planetary system.

Around the same time that 61 Cygni was being investigated, similar claims about the presence of exoplanets were made about Lalande 21185: Lalande 21185 § Past claims of planets.

During the 1950s and 1960s, Peter van de Kamp of Swarthmore College made another prominent series of detection claims, this time for planets orbiting Barnard's Star. Astronomers now generally regard all early reports of detection as erroneous.

In 1991, Andrew Lyne, M. Bailes and S. L. Shemar claimed to have discovered a pulsar planet in orbit around PSR 1829-10, using pulsar timing variations. The claim briefly received intense attention, but Lyne and his team soon retracted it.

=== Confirmed discoveries ===
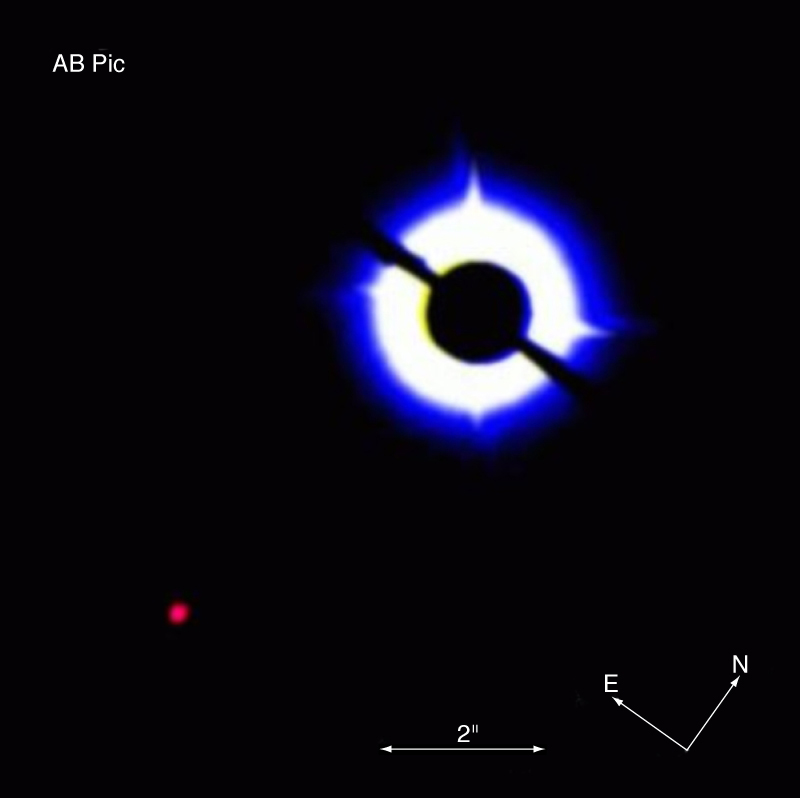
Coronagraphic image of AB Pictoris showing a companion (bottom left), which is either a brown dwarf or a massive planet. The data were obtained on 16 March 2003 with NACO on the VLT, using a 1.4 arcsec occulting mask on top of AB Pictoris.

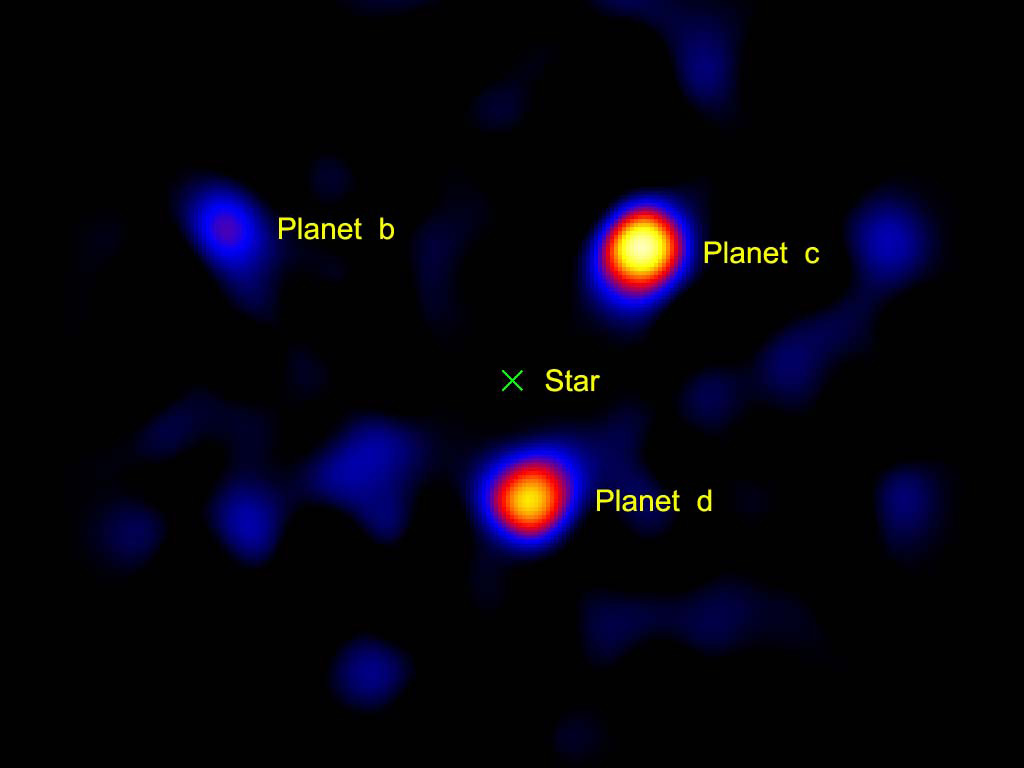
The three known planets of the star HR 8799, as imaged by the Hale Telescope. The light from the central star was blanked out by a vector vortex coronagraph.

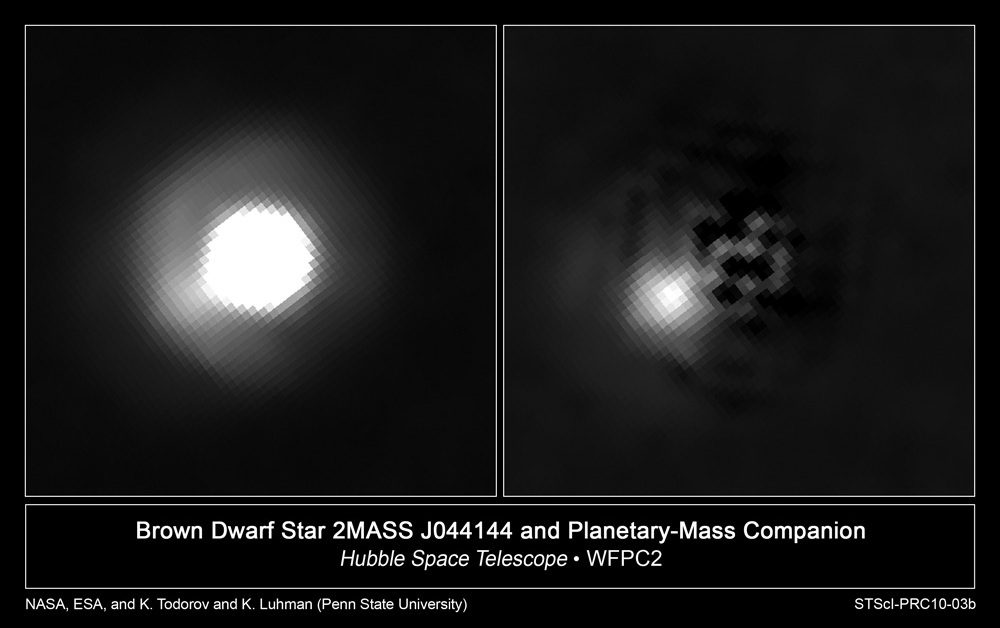
2MASS J044144 is a brown dwarf with a companion about 5–10 times the mass of Jupiter. It is not clear whether this companion object is a sub-brown dwarf or a planet.

As of 8 October 2026, a total of 6,464 confirmed exoplanets are listed in the NASA Exoplanet Archive, including a few that were confirmations of controversial claims from the late 1980s. The first published discovery to receive subsequent confirmation was made in 1988 by the Canadian astronomers Bruce Campbell, G. A. H. Walker, and Stephenson Yang of the University of Victoria and the University of British Columbia. Although they were cautious about claiming a planetary detection, their radial-velocity observations suggested that a planet orbits the star Gamma Cephei. Partly because the observations were at the very limits of instrumental capabilities at the time, astronomers remained skeptical for several years about this and other similar observations. It was thought some of the apparent planets might instead have been brown dwarfs, objects intermediate in mass between planets and stars. In 1990, additional observations were published that supported the existence of the planet orbiting Gamma Cephei, but subsequent work in 1992 again raised serious doubts. Finally, in 2003, improved techniques allowed the planet's existence to be confirmed.

On 9 January 1992, radio astronomers Aleksander Wolszczan and Dale Frail announced the discovery of two planets orbiting the millisecond pulsar PSR 1257+12 based on the variability of timing of the pulses. This discovery was confirmed, and is generally considered to be the first definitive detection of exoplanets. Follow-up observations solidified these results, and confirmation of a third planet in 1994 revived the topic in the popular press. These pulsar planets are thought to have formed from the unusual remnants of the supernova that produced the pulsar, in a second round of planet formation, or else to be the remaining rocky cores of gas giants that somehow survived the supernova and then decayed into their current orbits. As pulsars are aggressive stars, it was considered unlikely at the time that a planet could form in their orbit.

In the early 1990s, a group of astronomers led by Donald Backer, who were studying what they thought was a binary pulsar (PSR B1620−26 b), determined that a third object was needed to explain the observed Doppler shifts. Within a few years, the gravitational effects of the planet on the orbit of the pulsar and white dwarf had been measured, giving an estimate of the mass of the third object that was too small to be a star. The conclusion that the third object was a planet was announced by Stephen Thorsett and his collaborators in 1993.

On 6 October 1995, Michel Mayor and Didier Queloz of the University of Geneva announced the first definitive detection of an exoplanet orbiting a main-sequence star, nearby G-type star 51 Pegasi. This discovery, made at the Observatoire de Haute-Provence, ushered in the modern era of exoplanetary discovery, and was recognized by a share of the 2019 Nobel Prize in Physics. Technological advances, most notably in high-resolution spectroscopy, led to the rapid detection of many new exoplanets: astronomers could detect exoplanets indirectly by measuring their gravitational influence on the motion of their host stars. More extrasolar planets were later detected by observing the variation in a star's apparent luminosity as an orbiting planet transited in front of it.

Initially, most known exoplanets were massive planets that orbited very close to their parent stars. Astronomers were surprised by these "hot Jupiters", because theories of planetary formation had indicated that giant planets should only form at large distances from stars. But eventually more planets of other sorts were found, and it is now clear that hot Jupiters make up a minority of exoplanets. In 1999, Upsilon Andromedae became the first main-sequence star known to have multiple planets. Kepler-16 contains the first discovered planet that orbits a binary main-sequence star system.

On 26 February 2014, NASA announced the discovery of 715 newly verified exoplanets around 305 stars by the Kepler Space Telescope. These exoplanets were checked using a statistical technique called "verification by multiplicity". Before these results, most confirmed planets were gas giants comparable in size to Jupiter or larger because they were more easily detected, but the Kepler planets are mostly between the size of Neptune and the size of Earth.

On 23 July 2015, NASA announced Kepler-452b, a near-Earth-size planet orbiting the habitable zone of a G2-type star.

On 6 September 2018, NASA discovered an exoplanet about 145 light years away from Earth in the constellation Virgo. This exoplanet, Wolf 503b, is twice the size of Earth and was discovered orbiting a type of star known as an "Orange Dwarf". Wolf 503b completes one orbit in as few as six days because it is very close to the star. Wolf 503b is the only exoplanet that large that can be found near the so-called small planet radius gap. The gap, sometimes called the Fulton gap, is the observation that it is unusual to find exoplanets with sizes between 1.5 and 2 times the radius of the Earth.

=== Candidate discoveries ===
As of January 2020, NASA's Kepler and TESS missions had identified 4,374 planetary candidates yet to be confirmed, several of them being nearly Earth-sized and located in the habitable zone, some around Sun-like stars.

Exoplanet populations – June 2017

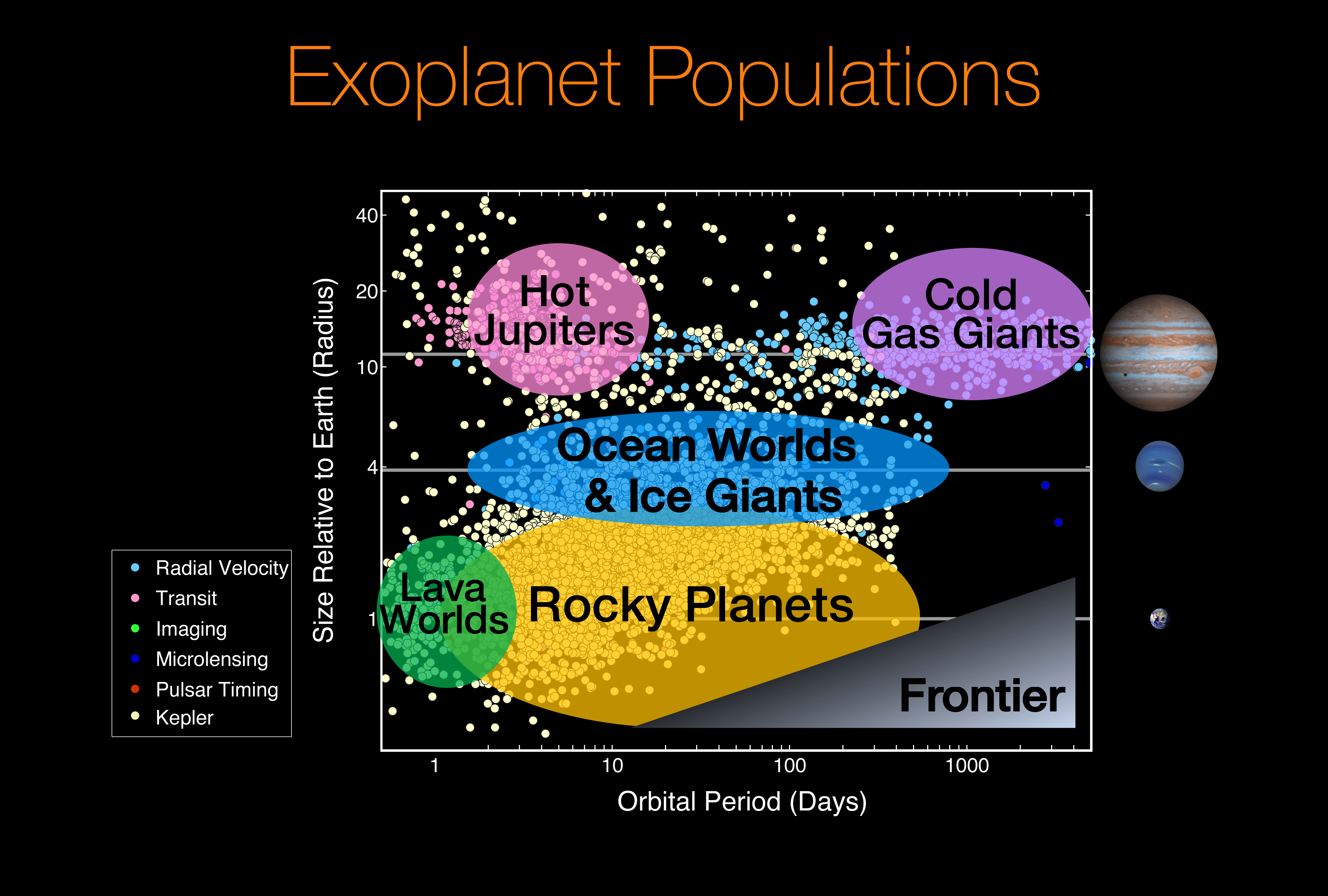
Exoplanet populations; colors indicate detection method

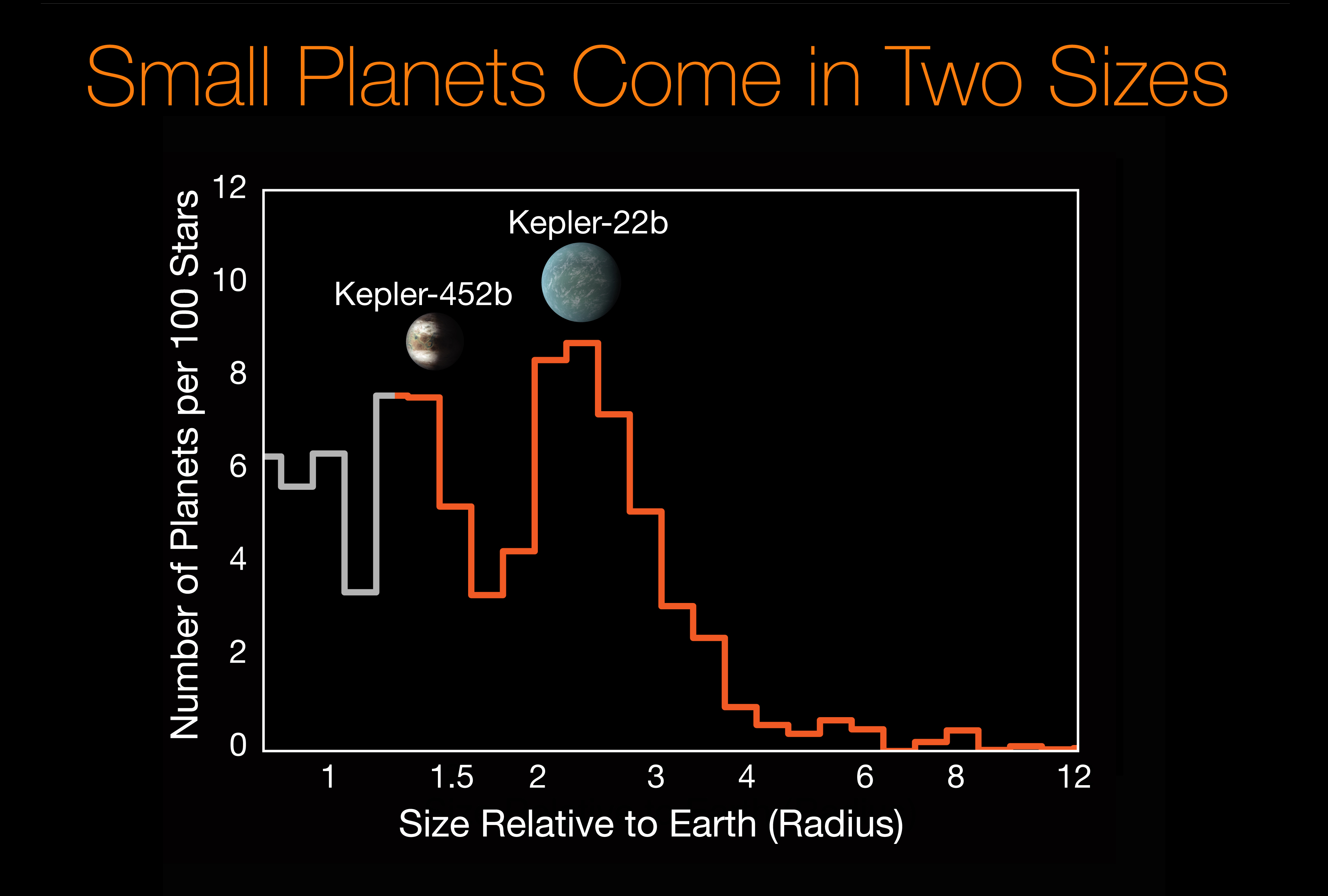
Small planets come in two sizes

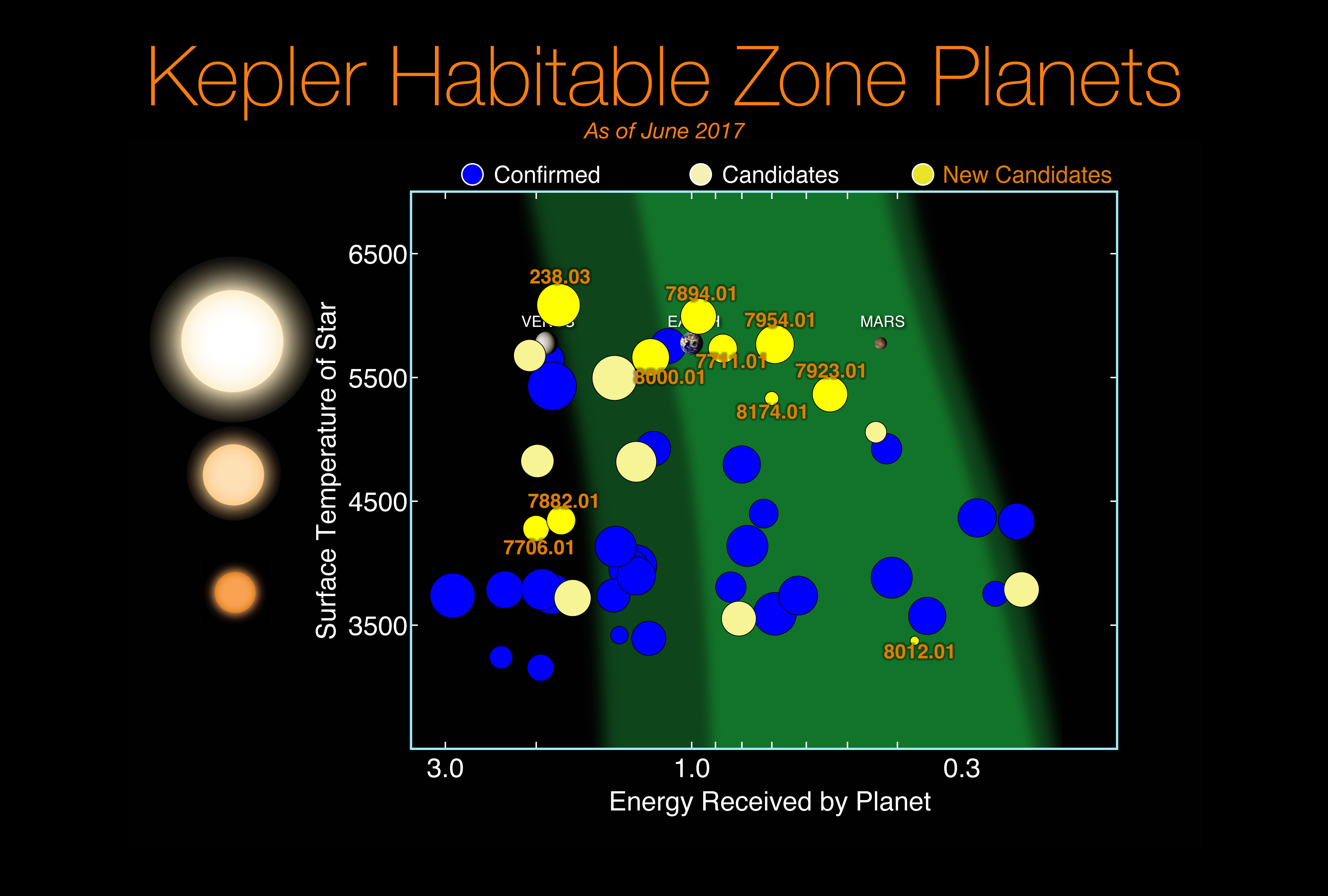
Kepler habitable zone planets

In September 2020, astronomers reported evidence, for the first time, of an extragalactic planet, M51-ULS-1b, detected by eclipsing a bright X-ray source (XRS), in the Whirlpool Galaxy (M51a).

== Detection methods ==
View source data.

=== Direct imaging ===
Directly imaged planet Beta Pictoris b, with an edge-on orbit as seen from Earth

Planets are extremely faint compared to their parent stars. For example, a Sun-like star is about a billion times brighter than the reflected light from any exoplanet orbiting it. It is difficult to detect such a faint light source, and furthermore, the parent star causes a glare that tends to wash it out. It is necessary to block the light from the parent star to reduce the glare while leaving the light from the planet detectable; doing so is a major technical challenge which requires extreme optothermal stability. Almost all exoplanets that have been directly imaged are both large (more massive than Jupiter) and widely separated from their parent stars.

Specially designed direct-imaging instruments such as Gemini Planet Imager, VLT-SPHERE, and SCExAO will image dozens of gas giants, but the vast majority of known extrasolar planets have only been detected through indirect methods.

=== Indirect methods ===
Transit method

The star appears to dim slightly when the exoplanet passes in front

If a planet crosses (or transits) in front of its parent star's disk, then the observed brightness of the star drops by a small amount. The amount by which the star dims depends on its size and on the size of the planet, among other factors. Because the transit method requires that the planet's orbit intersect a line-of-sight between the host star and Earth, the probability that an exoplanet in a randomly oriented orbit will be observed to transit the star is somewhat small. The Kepler telescope used this method.
Radial velocity or Doppler method
As a planet orbits a star, the star also moves in its own small orbit around the system's center of mass. Variations in the star's radial velocity—that is, the speed with which it moves towards or away from Earth—can be detected from displacements in the star's spectral lines due to the Doppler effect. Extremely small radial-velocity variations can be observed, of 1 m/s or even somewhat less.
Transit timing variation (TTV)
When multiple planets are present, each one slightly perturbs the others' orbits. Small variations in the times of transit for one planet can thus indicate the presence of another planet, which itself may or may not transit. For example, variations in the transits of the planet Kepler-19b suggest the existence of a second planet in the system, the non-transiting Kepler-19c.
Transit duration variation (TDV)

Animation showing difference between planet transit timing of one-planet and two-planet systems

When a planet orbits multiple stars or if the planet has moons, its transit time can significantly vary per transit. Although no new planets or moons have been discovered with this method, it is used to successfully confirm many transiting circumbinary planets.
Gravitational microlensing
Microlensing occurs when the gravitational field of a star acts like a lens, magnifying the light of a distant background star. Planets orbiting the lensing star can cause detectable anomalies in magnification as it varies over time. Unlike most other methods which have a detection bias towards planets with small (or for resolved imaging, large) orbits, the microlensing method is most sensitive to detecting planets around 1–10 AU away from Sun-like stars.
Astrometry

A planet is able to gravitationally pull its host star

Astrometry consists of precisely measuring a star's position in the sky and observing the changes in that position over time. The motion of a star due to the gravitational influence of a planet may be observable. Because the motion is so small, however, this method was not very productive until the 2020s. It has produced only a few confirmed discoveries, though it has been successfully used to investigate the properties of planets found in other ways.
Pulsar timing
A pulsar, a small, dense remnant of a star that has exploded as a supernova, emits radio waves regularly as it rotates. If planets orbit the pulsar, the motion of the pulsar around the system's center of mass alters the pulsar's distance to Earth over time. As a result, the radio pulses from the pulsar arrive on Earth at a later or earlier time. This light travel delay due to the pulsar being physically closer or farther from Earth is known as a Roemer time delay. The first confirmed discovery of an extrasolar planet was made using this method. But as of 2011, it has not been very productive; five planets have been detected in this way, around three different pulsars.
Variable star timing (pulsation frequency)
Like pulsars, there are some other types of stars which exhibit periodic activity. Deviations from periodicity can sometimes be caused by a planet orbiting it. As of 2013, a few planets have been discovered with this method.
Reflection/emission modulations
When a planet orbits very close to a star, it catches a considerable amount of starlight. As the planet orbits the star, the amount of light changes due to planets having phases from Earth's viewpoint or planets glowing more from one side than the other due to temperature differences.
Relativistic beaming
Relativistic beaming measures the observed flux from the star due to its motion. The brightness of the star changes as the planet moves closer or further away from its host star.
Ellipsoidal variations
Massive planets close to their host stars can slightly deform the shape of the star. This causes the brightness of the star to slightly deviate depending on how it is rotated relative to Earth.
Polarimetry
With the polarimetry method, a polarized light reflected off the planet is separated from unpolarized light emitted from the star. No new planets have been discovered with this method, although a few already discovered planets have been detected with this method.
Circumstellar disks
Disks of space dust surround many stars, thought to originate from collisions among asteroids and comets. The dust can be detected because it absorbs starlight and re-emits it as infrared radiation. Features on the disks may suggest the presence of planets, though this is not considered a definitive detection method.

== Formation and evolution ==
Planets may form within a few to tens (or more) of millions of years of their star forming. The planets of the Solar System can only be observed in their current state, but observations of different planetary systems of varying ages allows us to observe planets at different stages of evolution. Available observations range from young protoplanetary disks where planets are still forming to planetary systems of over 10 Gyr old. When planets form in a gaseous protoplanetary disk, they accrete hydrogen/helium envelopes. These envelopes cool and contract over time and, depending on the mass of the planet, some or all of the hydrogen/helium is eventually lost to space. This means that even terrestrial planets may start off with large radii if they form early enough. An example is Kepler-51b which has only about twice the mass of Earth but is almost the size of Saturn, which is a hundred times the mass of Earth. Kepler-51b is quite young at a few hundred million years old.

== Planet-hosting stars ==
The Morgan–Keenan stellar spectral classification

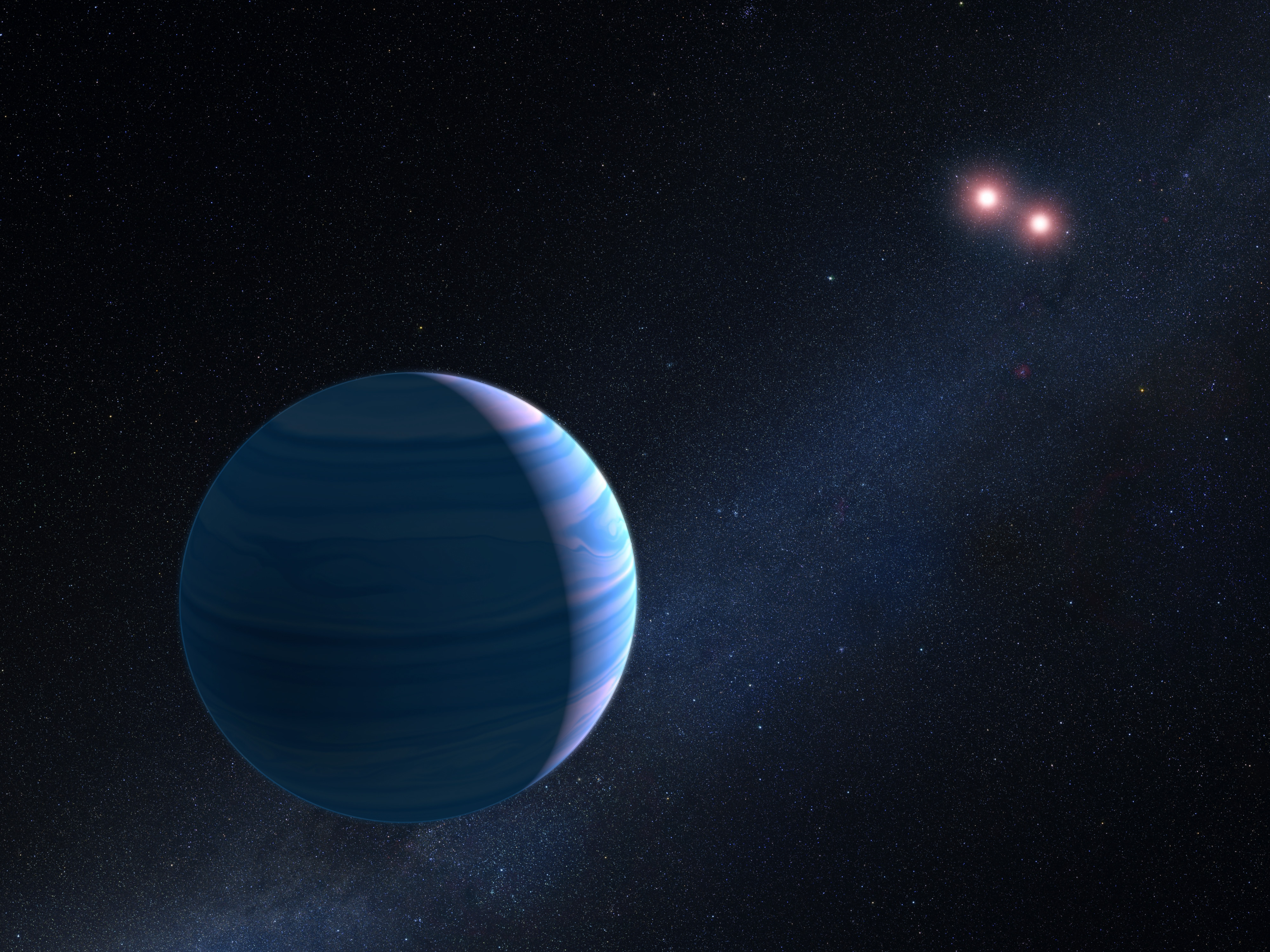
Artist's impression of exoplanet orbiting two stars.

There is at least one planet on average per star. About 1 in 5 Sun-like stars have an "Earth-sized" planet in the habitable zone.

Most known exoplanets orbit stars roughly similar to the Sun, i.e. main-sequence stars of spectral categories F, G, or K. Lower-mass stars (red dwarfs, of spectral category M) are less likely to have planets massive enough to be detected by the radial-velocity method. Despite this, several tens of planets around red dwarfs have been discovered by the Kepler space telescope, which uses the transit method to detect smaller planets.

Using data from Kepler, a correlation has been found between the metallicity of a star and the probability that the star hosts a giant planet, similar to the size of Jupiter. Stars with higher metallicity are more likely to have planets, especially giant planets, than stars with lower metallicity.

Some planets orbit one member of a binary star system, and several circumbinary planets have been discovered which orbit both members of a binary star. A few planets in triple star systems are known and one in the quadruple system Kepler-64.

== General features ==
=== Color and brightness ===
The apparent brightness (apparent magnitude) of a planet depends on how far away the observer is, how reflective the planet is (albedo), and how much light the planet receives from its star, which depends on how far the planet is from the star and how bright the star is. So, a planet with a low albedo that is close to its star can appear brighter than a planet with a high albedo that is far from the star.

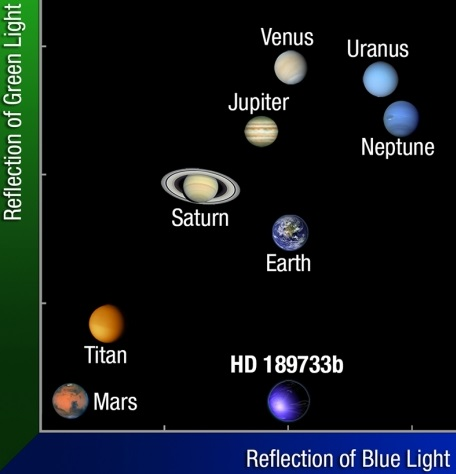
This color–color diagram compares the colors of planets in the Solar System to exoplanet HD 189733b. The exoplanet's deep blue color is produced by silicate droplets, which scatter blue light in its atmosphere.

In 2013, the color of an exoplanet was determined for the first time. The best-fit albedo measurements of HD 189733 b suggest that it is deep dark blue. Later that same year, the colors of several other exoplanets were determined, including GJ 504 b which visually has a magenta color, and Kappa Andromedae b, which if seen up close would appear reddish in color. Helium planets are expected to be white or grey in appearance.

The darkest known planet in terms of geometric albedo is TrES-2b, a hot Jupiter that reflects less than 1% of the light from its star, making it less reflective than coal or black acrylic paint. Hot Jupiters are expected to be quite dark due to sodium and potassium in their atmospheres, but it is not known why TrES-2b is so dark—it could be due to an unknown chemical compound.

For gas giants, geometric albedo generally decreases with increasing metallicity or atmospheric temperature unless there are clouds to modify this effect. Increased cloud-column depth increases the albedo at optical wavelengths, but decreases it at some infrared wavelengths. Optical albedo increases with age, because older planets have higher cloud-column depths. Optical albedo decreases with increasing mass, because higher-mass giant planets have higher surface gravities, which produces lower cloud-column depths. Also, elliptical orbits can cause major fluctuations in atmospheric composition, which can have a significant effect.

There is more thermal emission than reflection at some near-infrared wavelengths for massive and/or young gas giants. So, although optical brightness is fully phase-dependent, this is not always the case in the near infrared.

Temperatures of gas giants reduce over time and with distance from their stars. Lowering the temperature increases optical albedo even without clouds. At a sufficiently low temperature, water clouds form, which further increase optical albedo. At even lower temperatures, ammonia clouds form, resulting in the highest albedos at most optical and near-infrared wavelengths.

The only known ultra-hot Neptune exoplanet LTT 9779 b has high albedo mostly likely a result of clouds decks formed from Mg_{2}SiO_{4}, a silicate mineral. TOI-561 b, a small rocky planet orbiting close to its star, also has high albedo traced to silicate clouds.

=== Magnetic field ===
In 2014, a magnetic field around HD 209458 b was inferred from the way hydrogen was evaporating from the planet. It is the first (indirect) detection of a magnetic field on an exoplanet. The magnetic field is estimated to be about one-tenth as strong as Jupiter's.

The magnetic fields of exoplanets are thought to be detectable by their auroral radio emissions with sensitive low-frequency radio telescopes such as LOFAR, although they have yet to be found. The radio emissions could measure the rotation rate of the interior of an exoplanet, and may yield a more accurate way to measure exoplanet rotation than by examining the motion of clouds. However, the most sensitive radio search for auroral emissions, thus far, from nine exoplanets with Arecibo also did not result in any discoveries.

Earth's magnetic field results from its flowing liquid metallic core, but on massive super-Earths with high pressure, different compounds may form which do not match those created under terrestrial conditions. Compounds may form with greater viscosities and high melting temperatures, which could prevent the interiors from separating into different layers and so result in undifferentiated coreless mantles. Forms of magnesium oxide such as MgSi_{3}O_{12} could be a liquid metal at the pressures and temperatures found in super-Earths and could generate a magnetic field in the mantles of super-Earths.

Hot Jupiters have been observed to have a larger radius than expected. This could be caused by the interaction between the stellar wind and the planet's magnetosphere creating an electric current through the planet that heats it up (Joule heating) causing it to expand. The more magnetically active a star is, the greater the stellar wind and the larger the electric current leading to more heating and expansion of the planet. This theory matches the observation that stellar activity is correlated with inflated planetary radii.

In August 2018, scientists announced the transformation of gaseous deuterium into a liquid metallic hydrogen form. This may help researchers better understand giant gas planets, such as Jupiter, Saturn and related exoplanets, since such planets are thought to contain a lot of liquid metallic hydrogen, which may be responsible for their observed powerful magnetic fields.

Although scientists previously announced that the magnetic fields of close-in exoplanets may cause increased stellar flares and starspots on their host stars, in 2019 this claim was demonstrated to be false in the HD 189733 system. The failure to detect "star-planet interactions" in the well-studied HD 189733 system calls other related claims of the effect into question. A later search for radio emissions from eight exoplanets that orbit within 0.1 astronomical units of their host stars, conducted by the Arecibo radio telescope also failed to find signs of these magnetic star-planet interactions.

In 2019, the strength of the surface magnetic fields of 4 hot Jupiters were estimated and ranged between 20 and 120 gauss compared to Jupiter's surface magnetic field of 4.3 gauss.

In 2023 astronomers detected what might be the first sign of magnetosphere around a rocky exoplanet in the YZ Ceti system.

=== Plate tectonics ===
In 2007, two independent teams of researchers came to opposing conclusions about the likelihood of plate tectonics on larger super-Earths with one team saying that plate tectonics would be episodic or stagnant and the other team saying that plate tectonics is very likely on super-Earths even if the planet is dry.

If super-Earths have more than 80 times as much water as Earth, then they become ocean planets with all land completely submerged. However, if there is less water than this limit, then the deep water cycle would move enough water between the oceans and mantle to allow continents to exist.

=== Volcanism ===
Large surface temperature variations on 55 Cancri e have been attributed to possible volcanic activity releasing large clouds of dust which blanket the planet and block thermal emissions.

Tidal heating caused by gravitational tug of neighboring planets might lead to the emergence of volcanic activities on a terrestrial exoplanet.

=== Rings ===
In 2007, the star V1400 Centauri was occulted by an object (either a planet or brown dwarf) surrounded by an extensive disc of debris. The object, designated J1407b, was long believed to host a vast planetary ring system much larger than Saturn's rings. Follow-up observations found the supposed ring system could instead be a circumplanetary disk.

There is strong evidence of a ring system around HIP 41378 f, given the planet's measured radius is too large for its mass, the radius measurement might have been affected by a ring system around the planet. The candidate planet Proxima Centauri c possibly hosts a 5 R_{J} ring system based on its direct imaging-counterpart.

The rings of the Solar System's gas giants are aligned with their planet's equator. However, for exoplanets that orbit close to their star, tidal forces from the star would lead to the outermost rings of a planet being aligned with the planet's orbital plane around the star. A planet's innermost rings would still be aligned with the planet's equator so that if the planet has a tilted rotational axis, then the different alignments between the inner and outer rings would create a warped ring system.

=== Moons ===
There is evidence that moons around other planets, commonly referred to as exomoons, may exist, but none has been confirmed so far.

In 2012 a candidate exomoon was detected around WASP-12b via periodic light variations in the planet's light curve. Subsequent observations found this object might actually be a trojan planet. In 2013, a candidate exomoon was detected in the microlensing event MOA-2011-BLG-262, it was believed to be either a 0.5 M_{🜨} exomoon around a Jupiter-sized free-floating planet or a Neptune-mass planet around a red dwarf, but follow-up observations confirmed the latter scenario. In 2018, evidence suggesting a large exomoon orbiting Kepler-1625b was reported, and in 2021 evidence of an exomoon around Kepler-1708b was also reported. Their existence, however, remain doubtful, but follow-up observations may confirm these exomoons.

The studies of the Doppler shift of sodium doublet spectra in hot Jupiters such as WASP-76b, HD 189733 b or WASP-49b suggest Io-like exomoons around these planets.

=== Atmospheres ===
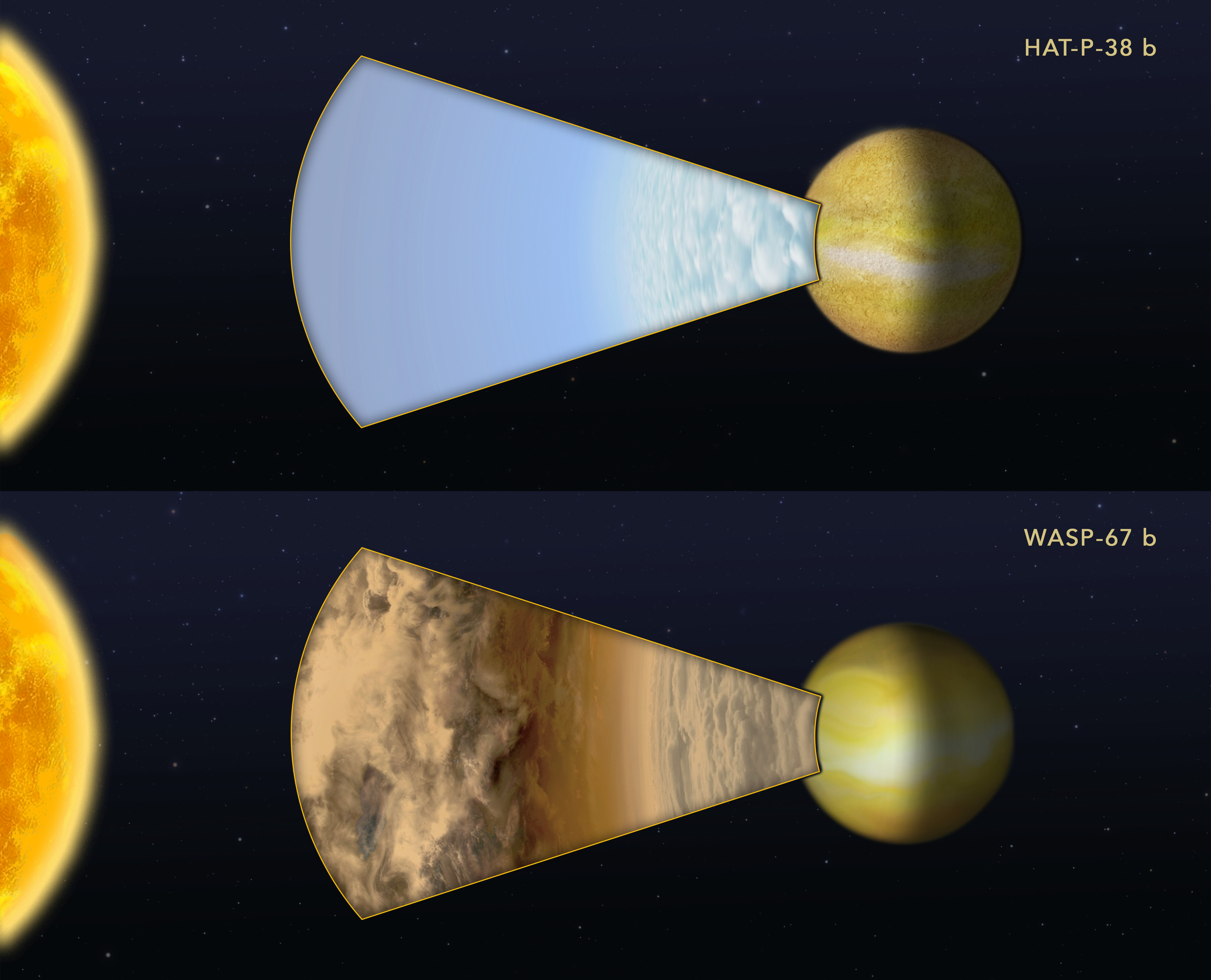
Clear versus cloudy atmospheres on two exoplanets.

Atmospheres have been detected around several exoplanets. The first to be observed was HD 209458 b in 2001.

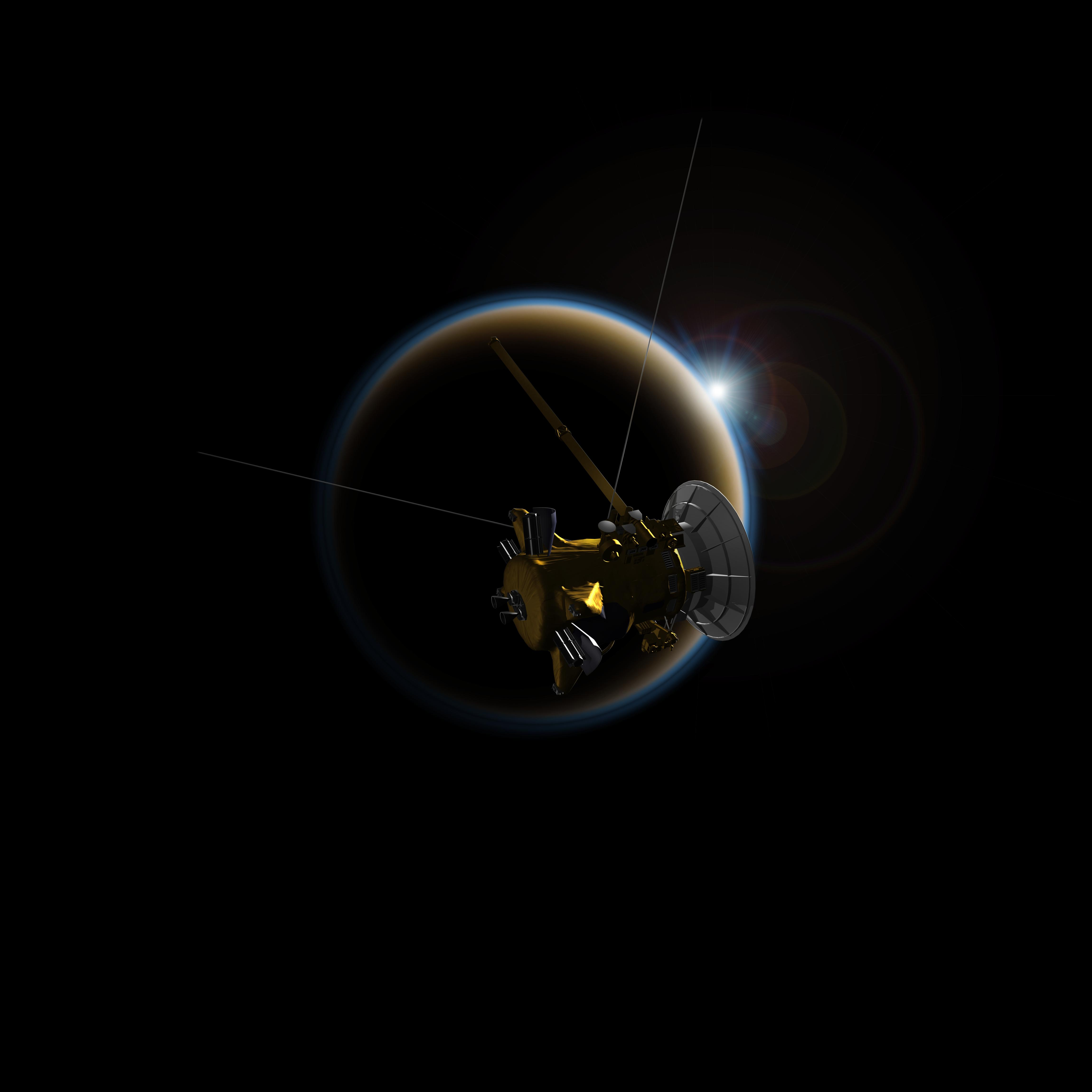
Sunset studies on Titan by Cassini help understand exoplanet atmospheres (artist's concept).

As of February 2014, more than fifty transiting and five directly imaged exoplanet atmospheres have been observed, resulting in detection of molecular spectral features; observation of day–night temperature gradients; and constraints on vertical atmospheric structure. Also, an atmosphere has been detected on the non-transiting hot Jupiter Tau Boötis b.

==== Comet-like tails ====
Kepler-1520b is a small rocky planet, very close to its star, that is evaporating and leaving a trailing tail of cloud and dust like a comet. The dust could be ash erupting from volcanoes and escaping due to the small planet's low surface-gravity, or it could be from metals that are vaporized by the high temperatures of being so close to the star with the metal vapor then condensing into dust.

Measurements of UV light from a transiting exoplanet GJ 436 b, show evidence that the atmosphere is evaporating, resulting in a giant cloud around the planet and, due to radiation pressure from the host star, a tail 14 million km (9 million mi) long.

By analyzing the transmission spectrum of helium in pixels around the transiting hot-Jupiter exoplanet WASP-121b, two tails spanning half of the planet's orbit were detected. The results are consistent with large scale outflow of helium from the exoplanet, both towards and away from its star.

=== Insolation pattern ===
Tidally locked planets in a 1:1 spin-orbit resonance would have their star always shining directly overhead on one spot, which would be hot with the opposite hemisphere receiving no light and being freezing cold. Such a planet could resemble an eyeball, with the hotspot being the pupil. Planets with an eccentric orbit could be locked in other resonances. 3:2 and 5:2 resonances would result in a double-eyeball pattern with hotspots in both eastern and western hemispheres. Planets with both an eccentric orbit and a tilted axis of rotation would have more complicated insolation patterns.

== Surface ==
=== Surface composition ===
Surface features can be distinguished from atmospheric features by comparing emission and reflection spectroscopy with transmission spectroscopy. Mid-infrared spectroscopy of exoplanets may detect rocky surfaces, and near-infrared may identify magma oceans or high-temperature lavas, hydrated silicate surfaces and water ice, giving an unambiguous method to distinguish between rocky and gaseous exoplanets.

In 2026, this concept was applied to exoplanet Kua'kua. Using the James Webb Space Telescope, the thermal emission spectrum of this exoplanet was measured during transit across its star, then compared to models of surface composition. The best match was to an "old, space-weathered surface with no evidence of accumulated volcanic gases".

=== Surface temperature ===
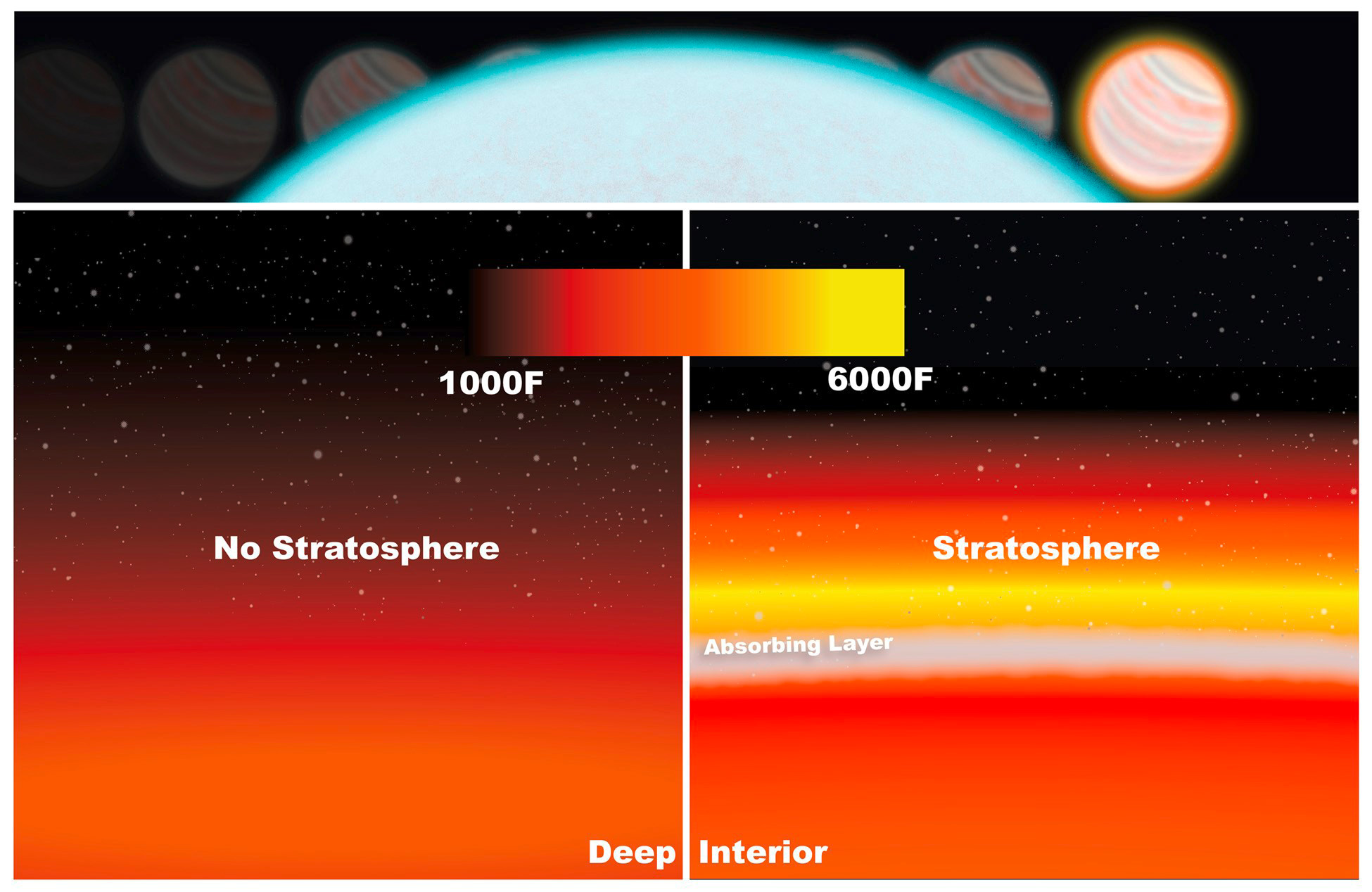
Artist's illustration of temperature inversion in exoplanet's atmosphere.

Measuring the intensity of the light it receives from its parent star can estimate the temperature of an exoplanet. For example, the planet OGLE-2005-BLG-390Lb is estimated to have a surface temperature of roughly −220 °C (50 K). However, such estimates may be substantially in error because they depend on the planet's usually unknown albedo, and because factors such as the greenhouse effect may introduce unknown complications. A few planets have had their temperature measured by observing the variation in infrared radiation as the planet moves around in its orbit and is eclipsed by its parent star. For example, the planet HD 189733b has been estimated to have an average temperature of 1,205 K (932 °C) on its dayside and 973 K (700 °C) on its nightside.

== Habitability ==
As more planets are discovered, the field of exoplanetology continues to grow into a deeper study of extrasolar worlds, and will ultimately tackle the prospect of life on planets beyond the Solar System. At cosmic distances, life can only be detected if it is developed at a planetary scale and strongly modified the planetary environment, in such a way that the modifications cannot be explained by classical physico-chemical processes (out of equilibrium processes). For example, molecular oxygen (O_{2}) in the atmosphere of Earth is a result of photosynthesis by living plants and many kinds of microorganisms, so it can be used as an indication of life on exoplanets, although small amounts of oxygen could also be produced by non-biological means. If water is a requirement for life, a habitable planet must sustain water. It must orbit a stable star at a distance within which planetary-mass objects with sufficient atmospheric pressure can support liquid water at their surfaces.

=== Habitable zone ===
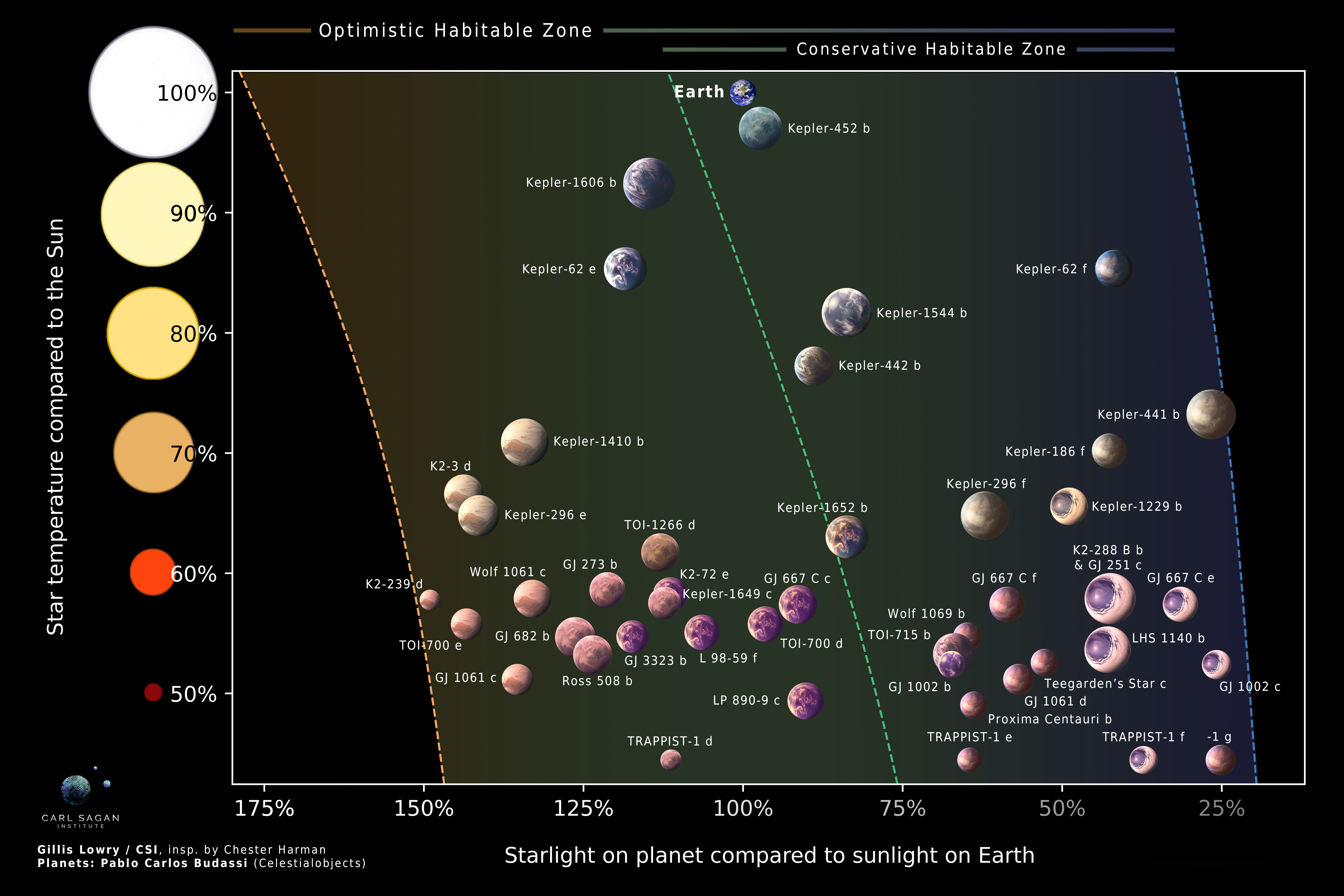
A diagram depicting habitable zone boundaries across star type with December 2025 data. Earth is plotted alongside 42 potentially rocky exoplanets within the habitable zone.

The habitable zone around a star is the region where the temperature is just right to allow liquid water to exist on the surface of a planet under a suitable atmosphere; that is, not too close to the star for the water to evaporate and not too far away from the star for the water to freeze. The heat produced by stars varies depending on the size and age of the star, so that the habitable zone can be at different distances for different stars. Also, the atmospheric conditions on the planet influence the planet's ability to retain heat so that the location of the habitable zone is also specific to each type of planet: desert planets (also known as dry planets), with very little water, will have less water vapor in the atmosphere than Earth and so have a reduced greenhouse effect, meaning that a desert planet could maintain oases of water closer to its star than Earth is to the Sun. The lack of water also means there is less ice to reflect heat into space, so the outer edge of desert-planet habitable zones is further out. Rocky planets with a thick hydrogen atmosphere could maintain surface water much further out than the Earth–Sun distance. Planets with larger mass have wider habitable zones because gravity reduces the water cloud column depth which reduces the greenhouse effect of water vapor, thus moving the inner edge of the habitable zone closer to the star.

Planetary rotation rate is one of the major factors determining the circulation of the atmosphere and hence the pattern of clouds: slowly rotating planets create thick clouds that reflect more and so can be habitable much closer to their star. Earth with its current atmosphere would be habitable in Venus's orbit, if it had Venus's slow rotation. If Venus lost its water ocean due to a runaway greenhouse effect, it is likely to have had a higher rotation rate in the past. Alternatively, Venus never had an ocean because water vapor was lost to space during its formation and could have had its slow rotation throughout its history.

Tidally locked planets (a.k.a. "eyeball" planets) can be habitable closer to their star than previously thought due to the effect of clouds: at high stellar flux, strong convection produces thick water clouds near the substellar point that greatly increase the planetary albedo and reduce surface temperatures.

Planets in the habitable zones of stars with low metallicity are more habitable for complex life on land than high metallicity stars because the stellar spectrum of high metallicity stars is less likely to cause the formation of ozone thus enabling more ultraviolet rays to reach the planet's surface.

Habitable zones have usually been defined in terms of surface temperature, however over half of Earth's biomass is from subsurface microbes, and the temperature increases with depth, so the subsurface can be conducive for microbial life when the surface is frozen and if this is considered, the habitable zone extends much further from the star, even rogue planets could have liquid water at sufficient depths underground. In an earlier era of the universe the temperature of the cosmic microwave background would have allowed any rocky planets that existed to have liquid water on their surface regardless of their distance from a star. Jupiter-like planets might not be habitable, but they could have habitable moons.

=== Ice ages and snowball states ===
The outer edge of the habitable zone is where planets are completely frozen, but planets well inside the habitable zone can periodically become frozen. If orbital fluctuations or other causes produce cooling, then this creates more ice, but ice reflects sunlight causing even more cooling, creating a feedback loop until the planet is completely or nearly completely frozen. When the surface is frozen, this stops carbon dioxide weathering, resulting in a build-up of carbon dioxide in the atmosphere from volcanic emissions. This creates a greenhouse effect which thaws the planet again. Planets with a large axial tilt are less likely to enter snowball states and can retain liquid water further from their star. Large fluctuations of axial tilt can have even more of a warming effect than a fixed large tilt. Counterintuitively, planets orbiting cooler stars, such as red dwarfs, are less likely to enter snowball states - because the infrared radiation emitted by cooler stars is mostly at longer wavelengths that are absorbed by ice, which heats it up.

=== Tidal heating ===
If a planet has an eccentric orbit, then tidal heating can provide another source of energy besides stellar radiation. This means that eccentric planets in the radiative habitable zone can be too hot for liquid water. Tides also circularize orbits over time, so there could be planets in the habitable zone with circular orbits that have no water because they used to have eccentric orbits. Eccentric planets further out than the habitable zone would still have frozen surfaces, but the tidal heating could create a subsurface ocean similar to Europa's. In some planetary systems, such as in the Upsilon Andromedae system, the eccentricity of orbits is maintained or even periodically varied by perturbations from other planets in the system. Tidal heating can cause outgassing from the mantle, contributing to the formation and replenishment of an atmosphere.

=== Potentially habitable planets ===
A review in 2015 identified exoplanets Kepler-62f, Kepler-186f and Kepler-442b as the best candidates for being potentially habitable. These are at a distance of 1000, 490 and 1,120 light-years away, respectively. Of these, Kepler-186f is in similar size to Earth with its 1.2-Earth-radius measure, and it is located towards the outer edge of the habitable zone around its red dwarf star. When looking at the nearest terrestrial exoplanet candidates, Proxima Centauri b is about 4.2 light-years away. Its equilibrium temperature is estimated to be −39 °C (234 K).

==== Earth-size planets ====
- In November 2013, it was estimated that 22±8% of Sun-like stars in the Milky Way galaxy may have an Earth-sized planet in the habitable zone. Assuming 200 billion stars in the Milky Way, that would be 11 billion potentially habitable Earths, rising to 40 billion if red dwarfs are included.
- Kepler-186f, a 1.2-Earth-radius planet in the habitable zone of a red dwarf, was reported in April 2014.
- Proxima Centauri b, a planet in the habitable zone of Proxima Centauri, the nearest known star to the solar system with an estimated minimum mass of 1.27 times the mass of the Earth.
- In February 2013, researchers speculated that up to 6% of small red dwarfs may have Earth-size planets. This suggests that the closest one to the Solar System could be 13 light-years away. The estimated distance increases to 21 light-years when a 95% confidence interval is used. In March 2013, a revised estimate gave an occurrence rate of 50% for Earth-size planets in the habitable zone of red dwarfs.
- At 1.63 times Earth's radius Kepler-452b is the first discovered near-Earth-size planet in the "habitable zone" around a G2-type Sun-like star (July 2015).
- In January 2020 researchers reported the discovery of TOI-700 d, the first Earth-size planet in the habitable zone to be detected by TESS.
- In May 2024, two teams of astronomers independently found Gliese 12 b, which is (as of 2024) the closest known transiting temperate Earth-size exoplanet.

Notable Exoplanets – Kepler Space Telescope
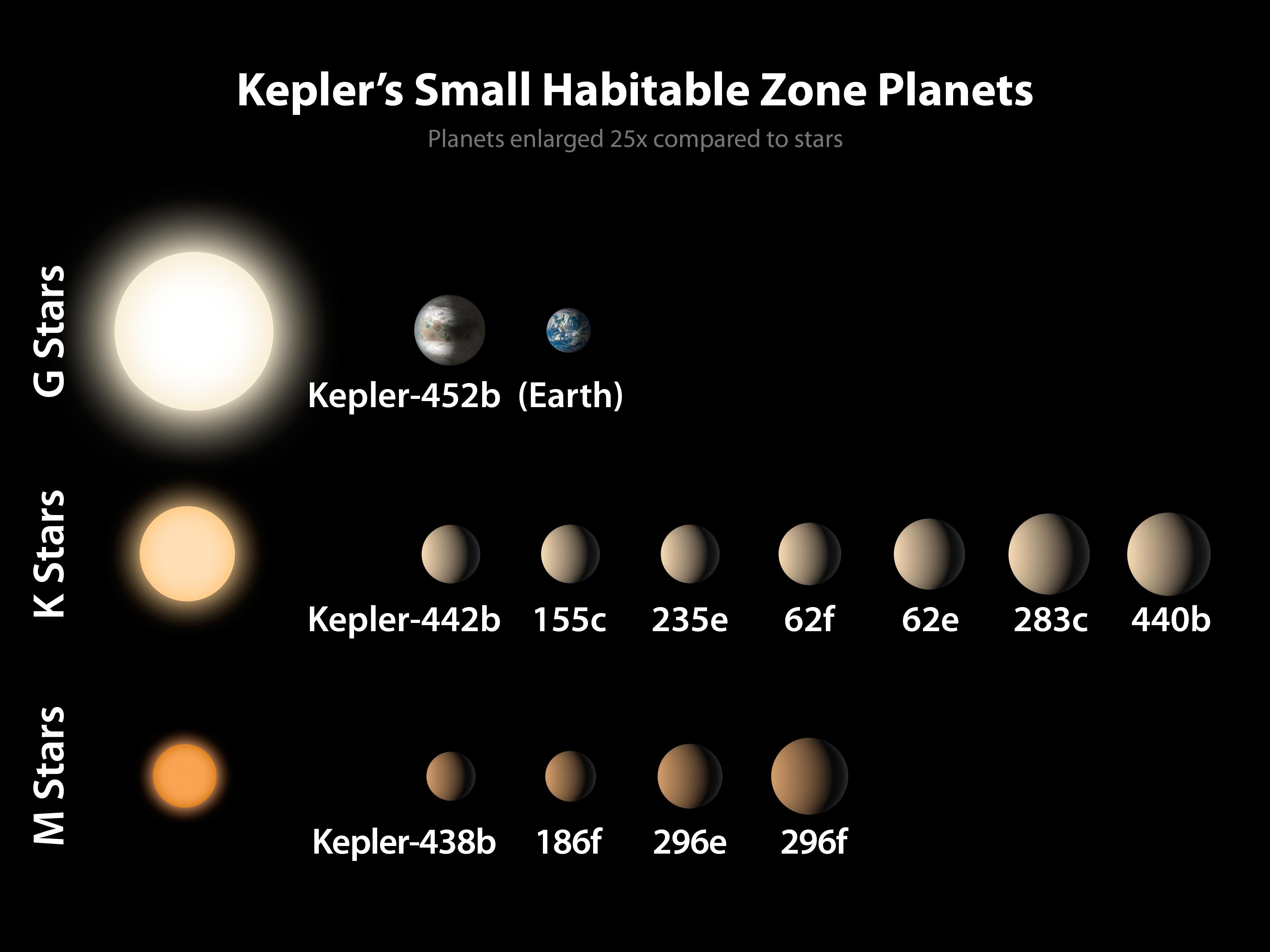
Comparison of small planets found by Kepler in the habitable zone of their host stars.

== Planetary system ==
Exoplanets are often members of planetary systems of multiple planets around a star. The planets interact with each other gravitationally and sometimes form resonant systems where the orbital periods of the planets are in integer ratios. The Kepler-223 system contains four planets in an 8:6:4:3 orbital resonance.

Some hot Jupiters orbit their stars in the opposite direction to their stars' rotation. One proposed explanation is that hot Jupiters tend to form in dense clusters, where perturbations are more common and gravitational capture of planets by neighboring stars is possible.

== Search projects ==
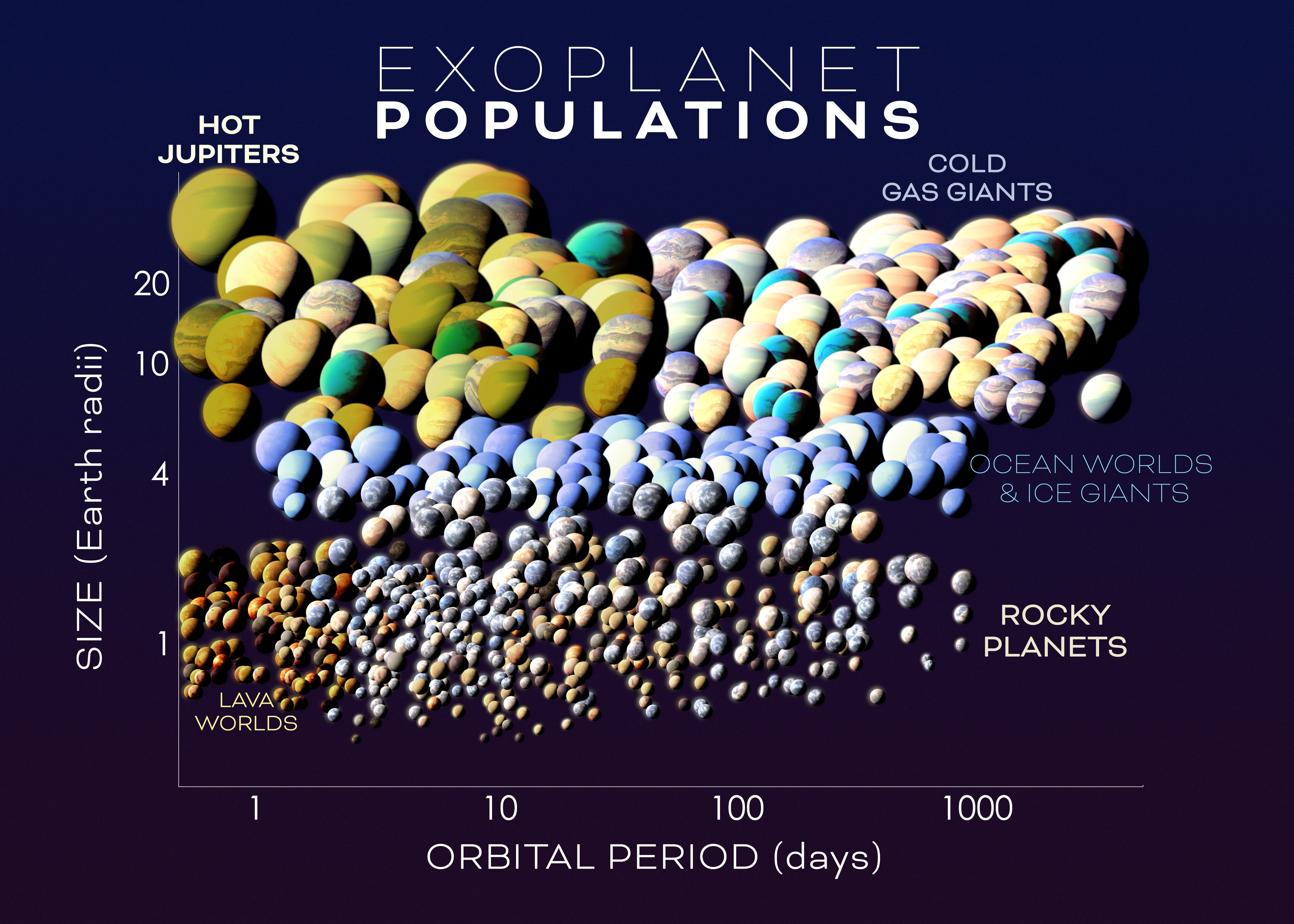
This plot shows currently known exoplanets, with different categories highlighted. Nancy Grace Roman Space Telescope will help fill in the bottom-right of the plot by finding small worlds in large orbits.

- ANDES – The ArmazoNes High Dispersion Echelle Spectrograph, a planet finding and planet characterisation spectrograph, is expected to be fitted onto ESO's ELT 39.3m telescope. ANDES was formally known as HIRES, which itself was created after a merger of the consortia behind the earlier CODEX (optical high-resolution) and SIMPLE (near-infrared high-resolution) spectrograph concepts.
- CoRoT – Space telescope that found the first transiting rocky planet.
- ESPRESSO – A rocky planet-finding, and stable spectroscopic observing, spectrograph mounted on ESO's 4 × 8.2 m VLT telescope, sited on the levelled summit of Cerro Paranal in the Atacama Desert of northern Chile.
- HARPS – High-precision echelle planet-finding spectrograph installed on the ESO's 3.6m telescope at La Silla Observatory in Chile.
- Kepler – Mission to look for large numbers of exoplanets using the transit method.
- TESS – Mission to search for new exoplanets, active from 2018 to 2020 and rotating to observe stars from all over the sky. As of 22 March 2025, TESS had identified 7,525 candidate exoplanets, of which 618 had been confirmed.

== See also ==
- Detecting Earth from distant star-based systems
- Encyclopaedia of Exoplanetary Systems
- Extrasolar planets in fiction
- Habitable zone for complex life
- Lists of exoplanets
- NASA Exoplanet Archive
- Gravitational capture
- List of planet types
- Desert planet
- Carbon planet
- Lava planet
- Eyeball planet
- Ocean world
- Ice planet
- Hycean planet
- Chthonian planet
