= Paulo Freire (astronomer) =

Portuguese astronomer

- Born: Paulo César Carvalho Freire; October 27, 1970 (age 55); Lisbon, Portugal
- Education: Instituto Superior Técnico
- Known for: Pulsars; general relativity
- Scientific career
- Fields: Astrophysics; radio astronomy
- Thesis: The Pulsars in 47 Tucanae (2000)
- Doctoral advisor: Andrew G. Lyne
- Website: www3.mpifr-bonn.mpg.de/staff/pfreire/

Paulo Freire (born October 27, 1970, in Lisbon) is a Portuguese astronomer.

He obtained his PhD in 2001 at the University of Manchester in Manchester, England; his supervisor was Andrew Lyne. From 2001 to 2009, Freire worked at Arecibo Observatory in Puerto Rico. Since 2009, he has been working at the Max Planck Institute for Radio Astronomy, in Bonn, Germany.

In 2011, he won a €1.9-million grant from the European Research Council.

In April 2013, he was part of the team researching the expansion of the experimentally verified scope of Einstein's theory of relativity as a result of observations of the pulsar PSR J0348+0432.
