= PSR B1829−10 =

Pulsar in the constellation Scutum

Observation data Epoch J2000.0 Equinox J2000.0
- Constellation: Scutum
- Right ascension: 18^{h} 32^{m} 40.866^{s}
- Declination: −10° 21′ 32.78″

Characteristics
- Spectral type: Pulsar

Astrometry
Distance	30,000 ly (9.200 pc)

Details
Mass	1.44 M_{☉}
Rotation	0.330354089443 s

Other designations
- NVSS J183241−102136, PSR B1829−10, PSR J1832−1021

Database references
SIMBAD	data

PSR B1829−10 (often shortened to PSR 1829−10) is a pulsar that is approximately 30,000 light-years away in the constellation of Scutum. This pulsar has been the target of interest, because of a mistaken identification of a planet around it. Andrew G. Lyne of the University of Manchester and Bailes claimed in July 1991 to have found "a planet orbiting the neutron star PSR 1829-10" but in 1992 retracted. They had failed to correctly take into account the ellipticity of Earth's orbit, and had incorrectly concluded that a planet with an orbital period of half a year existed around the pulsar. It completes rotation every 0.3303 seconds

== See also ==
- Exoplanet
- Hypothetical planet
- Pulsar planet
