= Duncan Lorimer =

Astrophysicist

Duncan Lorimer FRS
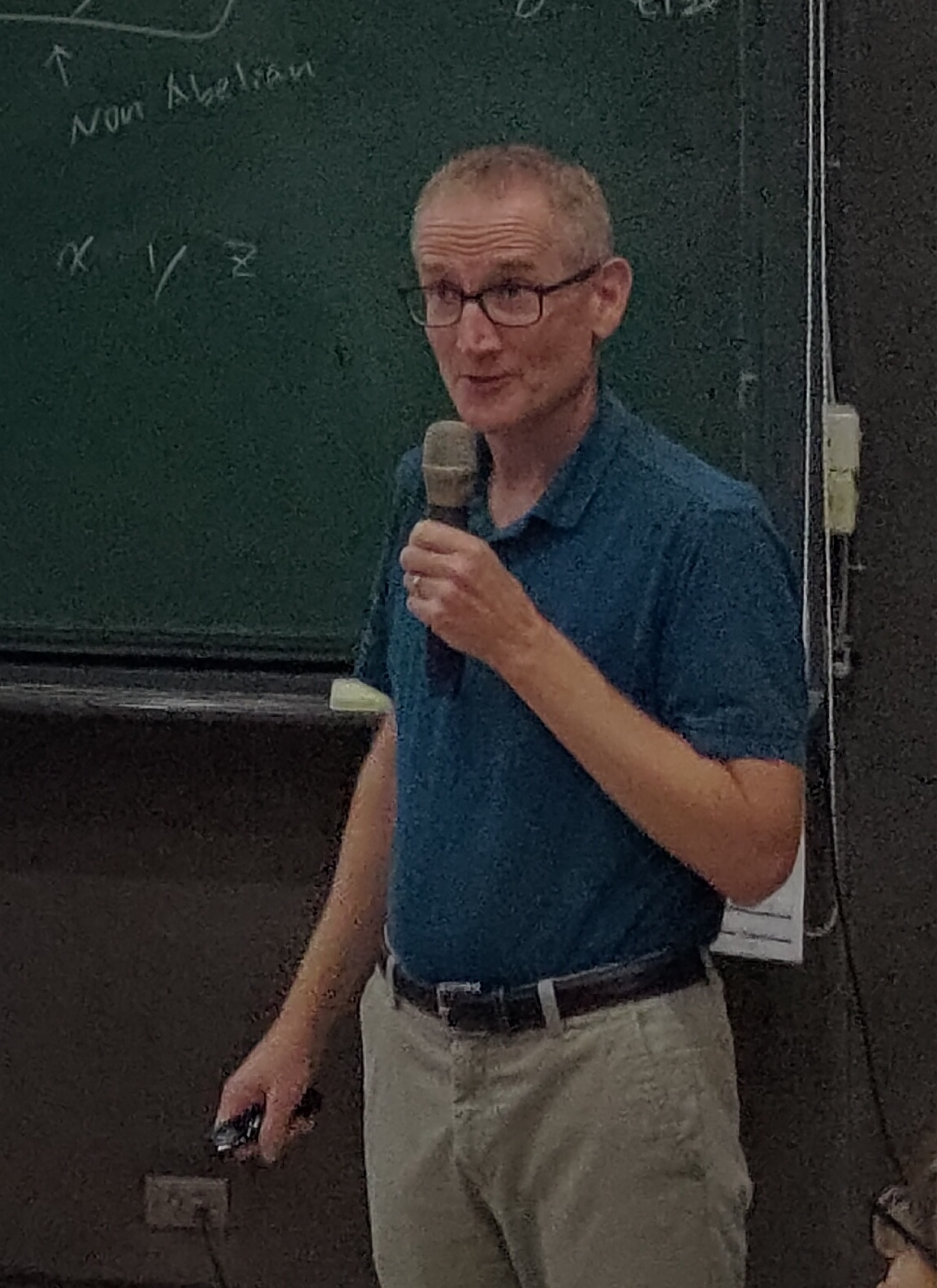
- Duncan Lorimer in 2023
- Born: Duncan Ross Lorimer; May 9, 1969 (age 55); Darlington
- Education: Queen Elizabeth Sixth Form College
- Alma mater: University of Wales (BSc); University of Manchester (MSc, PhD)
- Spouse: Maura McLaughlin
- Awards: Shaw Prize (2023)
- Scientific career
- Fields: Pulsars
- Institutions: West Virginia University; Cornell University; University of Manchester
- Thesis: Galactic population of millisecond and normal pulsars (1996)
- Doctoral advisor: Andrew Lyne; Matthew Bailes
- Website: physics.wvu.edu/directory/faculty/duncan-lorimer

Duncan Ross Lorimer FRS (born 1969) is a British-born American astrophysicist. He is a professor of physics and astronomy at West Virginia University, known for the discovery of the first fast radio burst in 2007.

== Education ==
Lorimer was educated at Queen Elizabeth Sixth Form College and University of Wales College at Cardiff where he studied Astrophysics. He received his MSc and PhD from the University of Manchester in 1991 and 1994, respectively, for research carried out at Jodrell Bank Observatory supervised by Andrew Lyne, Dick Manchester and Matthew Bailes.

== Career and research ==
Lorimer held appointments at University of Manchester (Lecturer, 1994–1995); the Max-Planck-Institute for Radio Astronomy (postdoctoral fellow, 1995–1998); Cornell University (postdoctoral Fellow, 1998–2001); University of Manchester (Royal Society University Research Fellow, 2001–2006) and West Virginia University (Faculty, 2006–present).

The first fast radio burst was discovered in 2007 when Lorimer assigned his student David Narkevic at West Virginia University to look through archival data taken in 2001 by the Parkes radio dish in Australia. Analysis of the survey data found a 30-jansky dispersed burst which occurred on July 24, 2001, less than 5 milliseconds in duration, located 3° from the Small Magellanic Cloud. The burst became known as the Lorimer Burst or FRB 010724.

=== Awards and honours ===
In 2023, he was awarded the Shaw Prize in Astronomy. He was elected a Fellow of the Royal Society (FRS) in 2024.

== Personal life ==
Lorimer's wife Maura McLaughlin is also a professor at West Virginia University. They have three children.
