= Andrew Lyne =

British physicist (born 1942)

Andrew Lyne FRS
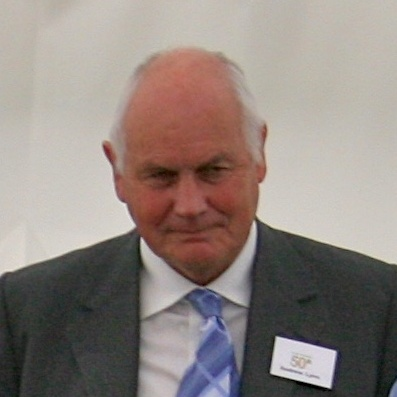
- Andrew Lyne in 2007
- Born: Andrew Geoffrey Lyne; 13 July 1942 (age 84)
- Education: The Portsmouth Grammar School
- Alma mater: University of Cambridge (BA); University of Manchester (PhD)
- Awards: Herschel Medal (1992)
- Scientific career
- Fields: Radio astronomy Pulsars
- Workplaces: Jodrell Bank Observatory; University of Manchester; University of Cambridge
- Thesis: Interferometric Observations of Lunar Occulations and Pulsars (1970)
- Doctoral advisor: Francis Graham-Smith
- Doctoral students: Duncan Lorimer
- Website: www.jb.man.ac.uk/~agl

Andrew Geoffrey Lyne FRS (born 13 July 1942) is a British physicist. Lyne is Langworthy Professor of Physics in the School of Physics and Astronomy, University of Manchester, as well as an ex-director of the Jodrell Bank Observatory. Despite retiring in 2007 he remains an active researcher within the Jodrell Bank Pulsar Group. Lyne writes that he is "mostly interested in finding and understanding radio pulsars in all their various forms and with their various companions. Presently, I am most occupied with the development of new multibeam search systems at Jodrell and Parkes, in order to probe deeper into the Galaxy, particularly for millisecond pulsars, young pulsars and any that might be in binary systems."

== Education ==
Lyne was educated at Portsmouth Grammar School, the Royal Naval School, Tal Handaq, Malta, and the University of Cambridge, where he read the Natural Sciences Tripos as a student of St John's College, Cambridge. After his undergraduate degree from Cambridge, he continued to the University of Manchester for a PhD in Radio Astronomy where his research supervised by Francis Graham-Smith.

== Career and research ==
In 1991, Andrew Lyne, Setnam Shemar and Matthew Bailes reported that they had discovered a pulsar orbited by a planetary companion; this would have been the first planet detected around another star. However, after this was announced, the group went back and checked their work, and found that they had not properly removed the effects of the Earth's motion around the Sun from their analysis, and, when the calculations were redone correctly, the pulse variations that led to their conclusions disappeared, and that there was in fact no planet around PSR 1829-10. When Lyne announced the retraction of his results at a meeting of the American Astronomical Society, he received thunderous applause from his scientific colleagues for having the intellectual integrity and the courage to admit this error publicly.

=== Double pulsar ===
In 2003, Lyne and his team discovered the first binary system found in which both components were pulsed neutron stars. Lyne's colleague Richard Manchester called the PSR J0737-3039 system a "fantastic natural laboratory" for studying specialized effects of the General Theory of Relativity. Other recent work that Lyne has undertaken includes research on the globular cluster at 47 Tucanae, whose dense stellar population acts as a nursery for millisecond and binary pulsars.

=== Awards and honours ===
Lyne was awarded the Herschel Medal by the Royal Astronomical Society in 1992 and elected a Fellow of the Royal Society (FRS) in 1996.

Academic offices
Preceded by Frank Read	Langworthy Professor at the University of Manchester; 2001–07	Succeeded by Andre Geim
