= Maura McLaughlin =

Astrophysics professor

- Born: Maura Ann McLaughlin; May 1972 (age 54)
- Education: Pennsylvania State University (BS); Cornell University (PhD)
- Spouse: Duncan Lorimer
- Awards: Member of the National Academy of Sciences (2024); Shaw Prize (2023); Sloan Research Fellowship
- Scientific career
- Fields: Astrophysics
- Workplaces: West Virginia University; Jodrell Bank Observatory; University of Manchester
- Thesis: Multi-wavelength studies of rotation-driven pulsars (2001)
- Doctoral advisor: James M. Cordes
- Website: physics.wvu.edu/directory/faculty/maura-mclaughlin

Maura Ann McLaughlin (born 1972) is an astrophysics professor at West Virginia University in Morgantown, West Virginia known for her work on fast radio bursts (FRBs).

== Education ==
McLaughlin grew up in Oreland, Pennsylvania. She received a Bachelor of Science degree in Astronomy and Astrophysics from the Pennsylvania State University in 1994. She obtained a PhD in Astronomy and Space Sciences from Cornell University in 2001 advised by James M. Cordes.

== Career and research ==
McLaughlin is known for her work on furthering the research on gravitational waves and for her dedication to the Pulsar Search Collaboratory.

As of 2024 McLaughlin is a professor in Astronomy and Physics at West Virginia University.

McLaughlin served as chair of the North American Nanohertz Observatory for Gravitational Waves (NANOGrav) collaboration. The team was originally funded by a 6.5 million dollar award given to them by the National Science Foundation as part of the Partnerships for International Research and Education (PIRE) program and is now an National Science Foundation (NSF) Physics Frontier Center. McLaughlin was also fundamental in the discovery of the double-pulsar system as well as in the discovery of several new pulsars. McLaughlin dedicates her time to the Pulsar Search Collaboratory located in Green Bank, West Virginia. The Pulsar Search Collaboratory involves high school students in a collaborative effort with the National Radio Astronomy Observatory (NRAO) to further information and discover new pulsars.

McLaughlin conducts her research on pulsars using the Green Bank Telescope, the Arecibo Observatory and previously the Jodrell Bank Observatory at the University of Manchester.

=== Awards and honors ===
McLaughlin was named a Fellow of the American Physical Society in 2021 and a member of the National Academy of Sciences in 2024. Other awards and honours include:

- Cottrell Scholar Award
- Alfred P. Sloan Fellowship
- PIRE Program Award
- In 2023 she was awarded the Shaw Prize in Astronomy for co-discovery of FRBs
- 2025 Bruno Rossi Prize

== Personal life ==
McLaughlin is married to Duncan Lorimer, a physics professor also at West Virginia University, with whom she has three children.
