= Matthew Bailes =

Astrophysicist

Matthew Bailes FAA
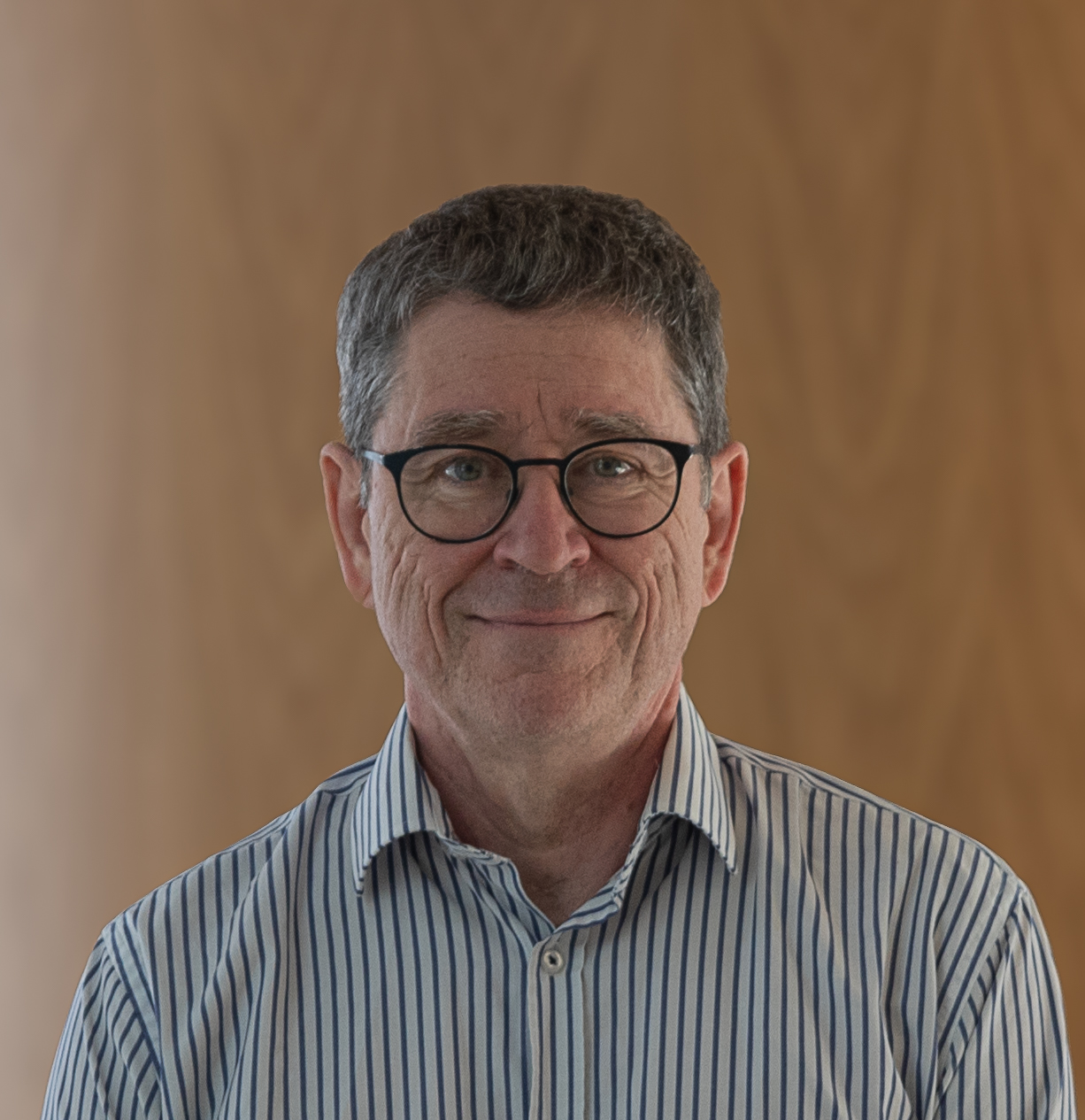
- Bailes in 2025
- Born: c. 1963 (age c. 63)
- Education: Australian National University (PhD)
- Awards: Australian Laureate Fellowship (2015); Shaw Prize (2023)
- Scientific career
- Fields: Astrophysics; Pulsars; Fast radio bursts Gravitational waves
- Workplaces: Swinburne University of Technology; Centre for Astrophysics and Supercomputing
- Thesis: The origin of pulsar velocities (1989)
- Doctoral students: Manisha Caleb; Duncan Lorimer
- Website: www.astronomy.swin.edu.au/staff/mbailes.html

Matthew Bailes FAA (born c. 1963) is an astrophysicist and Professor at the Centre for Astrophysics and Supercomputing, Swinburne University of Technology and the Director of OzGrav, the ARC Centre of Excellence for Gravitational Wave Discovery. In 2015 he won an ARC Laureate Fellowship to work on Fast Radio Bursts. He is one of the most active researchers in pulsars and Fast Radio Bursts in the world. His research interests includes the birth, evolution of binary and millisecond pulsars, gravitational waves detection using an array of millisecond pulsars and radio astronomy data processing system design for Fast Radio Burst discovery. He is now leading his team to re-engineer the Molonglo Observatory Synthesis Telescope with a newly designed correlation system for observation of pulsars and Fast Radio Bursts (FRBs).

== Education ==
Bailes was educated at the Australian National University, graduating with a PhD in 1989.

== Career and research ==
Bailes research interests are in astrophysics, pulsars, fast radio bursts, and gravitational waves.

Bailes founded the organisation for development of the Virtual Room, an octagonal virtual reality system for displaying planets, stars, and galaxies in the Universe. He made the 3D film Realising Einstein's Universe. His former doctoral student is Duncan Lorimer.

Bailes is a committee member of the Australia Telescope Steering Committee and on advisory board of Collaboration for Astronomy Signal Processing and Electronics Research (CASPER).

=== Awards and honours ===
Bailes was elected a Fellow of the Australian Academy of Science (FAAS) in 2022. In 2023, he was awarded the Shaw Prize in Astronomy shared equally with Duncan Lorimer and Maura McLaughlin for their discovery of FRBs. In 2024, Bailes was awarded the Prime Minister's Prize for Science for his work in the discovery of FRBs.
