= List of exoplanets discovered in 2013 =

This is a List of exoplanets discovered in 2013.

For exoplanets detected only by radial velocity, the mass value is actually a lower limit. (See Minimum mass for more information)

Name	Mass (M_{J})	Radius (R_{J})	Period (days)	Semi-major axis (AU)	Temp. (K)	Discovery method	Distance (ly)	Host star mass (M_{☉})	Host star temp. (K)	Remarks
2MASS J01225093-2439505 b	24.5			52		imaging	120	0.4	3530	
BD+15 2940 b	1.11		137.48	0.539		radial vel.	572.2	1.1	4796	
CoRoT-25b	0.27	1.08	4.86069	0.0578		transit	3300	1.09	6040	
CoRoT-26b	0.52	1.26	4.20474	0.0526		transit	5400	1.09	5590	
DENIS-P J082303.1-491201 b	28.5		246.36	0.36		astrometry	67.7	0.07	2150	
Gliese 163 b	0.03335		8.63182	0.0607		radial vel.	48.8	0.4	3500	
Gliese 163 c	0.0214		25.63058	0.1254		radial vel.	48.8	0.4	3500	
Gliese 163 d	0.0925		603.95116	1.0304		radial vel.	48.8	0.4	3500	
Gliese 221b	0.027		3.8728	0.0428		radial vel.	66	0.7	4324	Disputed
Gliese 221 c	0.17		125.94	0.435		radial vel.	66	0.7	4324	
Gliese 328b	2.3		4100	4.5		radial vel.	65.3	0.69	3900	
Gliese 504 b	4			43.5		imaging	58.5	1.22	6234	
HAT-P-44b	0.352	1.242	4.301219	0.0507		transit	1180	0.94	5295	
HAT-P-44c	4		872.2	1.752		radial vel.	1180	0.94	5295	Period is ambiguous
HAT-P-45b	0.892	1.426	3.128992	0.0452		transit	990	1.26	6330	
HAT-P-46b	0.493	1.284	4.463129	0.0577		transit	970	1.28	6120	
HATS-2b	1.345	1.168	1.354133	0.023		transit	1200	0.88	5227	
HATS-3b	1.071	1.381	3.547851	0.0485	1648	transit	1480	1.21	6351	
HD 2952 b	1.6		311.6	1.2		radial vel.	375.8	2.54	4844	
HD 13908 b	0.865		19.382	0.154		radial vel.	218.2	1.29	6255	
HD 13908 c	5.13		931	2.03		radial vel.	218.2	1.29	6255	
HD 65216c	0.17		152.6	0.54		radial vel.	116.1	0.92	5666	False positive, another planet with same assigned name discovered in 2019.
HD 95086 b	5			55.7		imaging	298.7	1.6		
HD 103774 b	0.367		5.8881	0.07		radial vel.	173.1	1.33	6489	
HD 106906 b	11			650		imaging	299.5	1.5	6516	
HD 109271 b	0.054		7.8543	0.079		radial vel.	185.6	1.05	5783	
HD 109271 c	0.076		30.93	0.196		radial vel.	185.6	1.05	5783	
HD 113337 b	2.83		324	0.92		radial vel.	122.0	1.4	6576.6	
HD 120084 b	4.5		2082	4.3		radial vel.	318.5	2.39	4892	
HD 159243 b	1.13		12.62	0.11		radial vel.	223.7	1.12	6123	
HD 159243 c	1.9		248.4	0.8		radial vel.	223.7	1.12	6123	
HD 233604 b	6.575		192	0.747		radial vel.	2830±90	1.5	4791	
HD 285507 b	0.92±0.03		6.0962±0.0002			radial vel.	153	0.73±0.03	4503^{+85}_{−61}	member of Hyades (star cluster)
HD 112410 b	9.18		124.6	0.565		radial vel.	486.8	1.54	4830	
HIP 91258 b	1.068		5.0505	0.057		radial vel.	145.0	0.95	5519	
KELT-3b	1.477	1.345	2.7033904	0.04122		transit	580	1.28	6306	
KELT-6b	0.442	1.18	7.8455821	0.08		transit	720	1.13	6272	
Kepler-37b	0.03146	0.029	13.3675			transit	220	0.8	5417	
Kepler-37c	0.03776	0.067	21.302			transit	220	0.8	5417	
Kepler-37d	0.03839	0.173	39.7922			transit	220	0.8	5417	
Kepler-61b		0.192	59.87756			transit	1103±16	0.64	4017	
Kepler-62b	0.03	0.117	5.714932	0.0553		transit	1200	0.69	4925	
Kepler-62c	0.013	0.048	12.4417	0.0929		transit	1200	0.69	4925	
Kepler-62d	0.044	0.174	18.16406	0.12		transit	1200	0.69	4925	
Kepler-62e	0.113	0.144	122.3874	0.427		transit	1200	0.69	4925	Potentially habitable exoplanet
Kepler-62f	0.11	0.126	267.291	0.718		transit	1200	0.69	4925	Potentially habitable exoplanet
Kepler-63b	0.378	0.545	9.4341505	0.08		transit	650	0.98	5576	
Kepler-65b		0.127	2.15491	0.035		transit	999±8	1.25	6211	
Kepler-65c		0.23	5.859944	0.068		transit	999±8	1.25	6211	
Kepler-65d		0.136	8.13123	0.084		transit	999±8	1.25	6211	
Kepler-66b		0.25	17.815815	0.1352		transit	3610	1.04	5962	Belongs to open cluster NGC 6811
Kepler-67b		0.262	15.7259	0.1171		transit	3610	0.86	5331	Belongs to open cluster NGC 6811
Kepler-68b	0.01878	0.208	5.39875		1280	transit	440	1.08	5793	
Kepler-68c	0.02265	0.089	9.60504			transit	440	1.08	5793	
Kepler-68d	0.84007		625			radial vel.	440	1.08	5793	
Kepler-69b		0.2	13.722341	0.094		transit	2430±30	0.81	5638	
Kepler-69c		0.153	242.4613	0.64		transit	2430±30	0.81	5638	
Kepler-74b	0.63	0.96	7.340711	0.0781		transit	4300	1.18	6000	
Kepler-75b	10.1	1.05	8.8849116	0.0818		transit	3700	0.91	5200	
Kepler-76b	2.01	1.36	1.5449298	0.0274		orbital brightness modulation	2750±30	1.2	6409	
Kepler-77b	0.43	0.96	3.57878087	0.04501		transit	1900	0.95	5520	
Kepler-78b	0.006	0.105	0.355		2330	transit	407.1±1.1	0.76	5058	
Kepler-87b	1.02	1.204	114.73635	0.481	478	transit	4170±90	1.1	5600	Two more unconfirmed planets in the system
Kepler-87c	0.02	0.548	191.2318	0.676	403	transit	4170±90	1.1	5600	Two more unconfirmed planets in the system
Kepler-88b	0.027	0.337	10.95416			transit	1110	0.96	5471	
Kepler-88c	0.626		22.3395	0.15525		timing	1110	0.96	5471	
Kepler-89b	0.033	0.153	3.743208	0.05119		transit	1577±16	1.28	6182	
Kepler-89c	0.049	0.385	10.423648	0.1013		transit	1577±16	1.28	6182	
Kepler-89d	0.334	1.005	22.342989	0.1684		transit	1577±16	1.28	6182	
Kepler-89e	0.11	0.585	54.32031	0.3046		transit	1577±16	1.28	6182	
Kepler-90b		0.117	7.008151	0.074	1056	transit	2500	1.2	6080	
Kepler-90c		0.106	8.719375	0.089	981	transit	2500	1.2	6080	
Kepler-90d		0.256	59.73667	0.32	518	transit	2500	1.2	6080	
Kepler-90e		0.237	91.93913	0.42	448	transit	2500	1.2	6080	
Kepler-90f		0.257	124.9144	0.48	592	transit	2500	1.2	6080	
Kepler-90g		0.723	210.60697	0.71	340	transit	2500	1.2	6080	
Kepler-90h		1.008	331.60059	1.01	292	transit	2500	1.2	6080	
Kepler-91b	0.81	1.367	6.24658	0.0731		transit	3400	1.31	4550	
Kepler-92b	0.202	0.313	13.749			transit	1580±17	1.21	5883	
Kepler-92c	0.019	0.232	26.723			transit	1580±17	1.21	5883	
Kepler-102e	0.028	0.198	16.1457		579	transit	352.7±0.7	0.81	4909	
Kepler-105b		0.429	5.4122	0.066		transit	1517±18	0.96	5827	
Kepler-114c	0.009	0.143	8.041		623	transit	852±4	0.56	4605	
Kepler-114d	0.012	0.226	11.776		549	transit	852±4	0.56	4605	
Kepler-128b	0.097	0.101	15.09			transit	1307±12	1.18	6090	
Kepler-128c	0.105	0.101	22.804			transit	1307±12	1.18	6090	
Kepler-130b		0.091	8.457458	0.079		transit	1042±7	1	5884	
Kepler-145b	0.117	0.236	22.951			transit	1880±30	1.32	6022	
Kepler-145c	0.25	0.385	42.882			transit	1880±30	1.32	6022	
Kepler-177b	0.006	0.259	36.855			transit	4880±140	1.07	5942	
Kepler-177c	0.024	0.633	49.412			transit	4880±140	1.07	5942	
Kepler-238e	0.534	0.5	23.654			transit	6200±300	1.06	5751	
Kepler-238f	0.042	0.178	50.447			transit	6200±300	1.06	5751	
Kepler-276c	0.052	0.259	31.884			transit	3850±150	1.1	6105	
Kepler-276d	0.051	0.25	48.648			transit	3850±150	1.1	6105	
Kepler-277b	0.275	0.261	17.324			transit	3280±50	1.12	5946	
Kepler-277c	0.202	0.3	33.006			transit	3280±50	1.12	5946	
Kepler-279b		0.323	12.309681	0.112		transit	3480±70	1.1	6363	KOI-1236.01
Kepler-279c	0.155	0.384	35.736			transit	3490±70	1.1	6363	KOI-1236.02
Kepler-279d	0.118	0.277	54.414			transit	3490±70	1.1	6363	
Kepler-282d	0.192	0.219	24.806			transit	4540±150	0.97	5602	
Kepler-282e	0.177	0.277	44.347			transit	4540±150	0.97	5602	
Kepler-305b	0.033	0.321	5.487			transit	2900±90	0.76	5100	KOI-1563.01
Kepler-305c	0.019	0.294	8.291			transit	2900±90	0.76	5100	KOI-1563.02
Kepler-307b	0.02341	0.217	10.4208			transit	1908±17	0.91	5367	
Kepler-307c	0.01145	0.196	13.0729			transit	1908±17	0.91	5367	
Kepler-328b	0.09	0.205	34.921			transit	7700±500	1.15	5914	
Kepler-328c	0.124	0.482	71.312			transit	7700±500	1.15	5914	
Kepler-350c	0.019	0.277	17.849			transit	3210±70	1	6186	
Kepler-350d	0.047	0.25	26.136			transit	3210±70	1	6186	
Kepler-396b	0.238	0.312	42.994			transit	734±5	0.85	5384	KOI-2672.01
Kepler-396c	0.056	0.473	88.505			transit	734±5	0.85	5384	KOI-2672.02
Kepler-410Ab		0.253	17.833648	0.1226		transit	430	1.21	6273	
Kepler-411b		0.168	3.00516	0.038	1040	transit	503.5±1.5	0.83	4974	
Kepler-1359c		0.3711^{+0.12}_{−0.06}	505.46^{+0.05}_{−0.04}	1.143±0.018		transit	2182^{+81}_{−82}	0.78^{+0.03}_{−0.04}	4709^{+46}_{−56}	Also called KIC 6436029 c, discovery retracted in 2015 after 3rd transit was proven to be false.
MOA-2008-BLG-379Lb	4.1			3.3		microlensing	11000	0.56		
MOA-2010-BLG-328Lb	0.02895			0.92		microlensing	2600	0.11		
MOA-2011-BLG-293Lb	4.8			1.1		microlensing	25200	0.86		
MOA-2011-BLG-322Lb	11.6			4.3		microlensing	24700	0.39		
OGLE-2011-BLG-0251Lb	0.53			2.72		microlensing	8400	0.26		
OGLE-2012-BLG-358Lb	1.85			0.87		microlensing	5700	0.02		Orbiting a brown dwarf
OGLE-2012-BLG-406Lb	2.73			3.45		microlensing	16200	0.44		
Omega Serpentis b	1.7		277.02	1.1		radial vel.	263.0	2.17	4770	
PH2b		0.903	282.5255	0.828	281	transit	1130±10	0.94	5629	Also called Kepler-86b
POTS-1b	2.31	0.941	3.1606296	0.03734		transit	3900	0.69	4400	
PSO J318.5−22	6.5	1.53	N/A	N/A	1160	imaging	80	N/A	N/A	Rogue planet
ROXs 12b	16			210		imaging	390	0.87	3850	
ROXs 42Bb	9			157		imaging	440	1		
WASP-8c	9.45		4323	5.28		radial vel.	280	1.03	5600	
WASP-65b	1.55	1.112	2.3114243	0.0334		transit	1000	0.93	5600	
WASP-68b	0.95	1.24	5.084298	0.06206		transit	962±8	1.24	5911	
WASP-69b	0.26	1.057	3.8681382	0.04525	963	transit	160	0.83	4715	
WASP-70Ab	0.59	1.164	3.7130203	0.04853	1387	transit	800	1.11	5763	
WASP-73b	1.88	1.16	4.08722	0.05512	1790	transit	1042±9	1.34	6036	
WASP-75b	1.07	1.27	2.484193	0.0375		transit	850	1.14	6100	
WASP-76b	0.92	1.83	1.809886	0.033	2190	transit	390	1.46	6250	
WASP-80b	0.538	0.999	3.06785234	0.0344		transit	200	0.58	4143	Proper name Wadirum
WASP-82b	1.24	1.67	2.705782	0.0447	2190	transit	650	1.63	6490	
WASP-84b	0.694	0.942	8.5234865	0.0771	797	transit	410	0.84	5314	
WASP-88b	0.56	1.7	4.954	0.06431	1775	transit	1730±30	1.45	6431	
WASP-90b	0.63±0.07	1.63±0.09	3.916243±0.000003	0.0562±0.0012	1840±50	transit	1100±200	1.55±0.10	6440±130	
WASP-95b	1.13^{+0.1}_{−0.04}	1.21±0.06	2.184673±0.0000014	0.03416±0.00083	1570±50	transit	450±2	1.11±0.09	5630±130	
WASP-96b	0.48±0.03	1.2±0.06	3.4252602±0.0000027	0.0453±0.0013	1285±40	transit	1161±15	1.06±0.09	5540±140	
WASP-97b	1.32±0.05	1.13±0.06	2.07276±0.000001	0.03303±0.00056	1555±40	transit	494.9±1.7	1.12±0.06	5640±100	
WASP-98b	0.83±0.07	1.10±0.04	2.96264036±0.0000013	0.03762±0.001	1180±30	transit	926±5	0.69±0.06	5525±130	
WASP-99b	2.78±0.13	1.10^{+0.08}_{−0.05}	5.75251±0.00004	0.0717±0.0016	1480±40	transit	519±2	1.48±0.10	6180±100	
WASP-100b	2.03±0.12	1.69±0.29	2.849375±0.000008	0.0457±0.0010	2190±140	transit	1201±9	1.57±0.10	6900±120	
WASP-101b	0.50±0.04	1.41±0.05	3.585722±0.000004	0.0506±0.0009	1560±35	transit	660±3	1.34±0.07	6400±110	
WTS-2b	1.12	1.363	1.0187068	0.01855	2000	transit	3300	0.82	5000	

== Bodies previously considered as candidates ==
MOA-2011-BLG-262L was once considered as a candidate exoplanet. It was once believed to be either an exoplanet with 3.2 times the mass of Jupiter and a exomoon with 0.47 times Earth's mass or a red dwarf with a mass of 0.11 solar masses orbited by a ~17 M_{🜨} planet, but the latter scenario was confirmed in 2024 based on observations of the host star by the Keck telescope, 10 years after the ending of the microlensing event.

== Specific exoplanet lists ==
Lists of exoplanets

- List of directly imaged exoplanets
- List of exoplanet extremes
- List of exoplanet firsts
- List of exoplanets discovered by the Kepler space telescope
- List of exoplanets observed during Kepler's K2 mission
- List of exoplanets discovered by the TESS mission
- List of extrasolar candidates for liquid water
- List of terrestrial exoplanet candidates for atmosphere detection
- List of hottest exoplanets
- List of coldest exoplanets
- List of multiplanetary systems
- List of circumbinary planets
- List of nearest exoplanets
- List of nearest terrestrial exoplanet candidates
- List of potentially habitable exoplanets
- List of proper names of exoplanets
- List of largest exoplanets
- List of smallest exoplanets
- List of transiting exoplanets
- List of exoplanets and planetary debris around giant stars
- List of exoplanets and planetary debris around white dwarfs
- List of extrasolar planetary collisions

=== Lists of exoplanets by year of discovery ===
- List of exoplanets discovered before 2000 (31)
- List of exoplanets discovered between 2000–2009 (375)
- List of exoplanets discovered in 2010 (109)
- List of exoplanets discovered in 2011 (179)
- List of exoplanets discovered in 2012 (149)
- List of exoplanets discovered in 2013 (149)
- List of exoplanets discovered in 2014 (869)
- List of exoplanets discovered in 2015 (144)
- List of exoplanets discovered in 2016 (1498)
- List of exoplanets discovered in 2017 (152)
- List of exoplanets discovered in 2018 (300)
- List of exoplanets discovered in 2019 (169)
- List of exoplanets discovered in 2020 (256)
- List of exoplanets discovered in 2021 (253)
- List of exoplanets discovered in 2022 (312)
- List of exoplanets discovered in 2023 (304)
- List of exoplanets discovered in 2024 (284)
- List of exoplanets discovered in 2025 (138)
- List of exoplanets discovered in 2026 (158)
