= Planet-hosting star =

Stars that host planetary systems

A planet-hosting star is a star that gravitationally binds planets and other celestial bodies (planetary mass or not) to orbit around itself, therefore forming a planetary system with the said star as the primary body. There are correlations between stars' characteristics and the characteristics of the orbiting planets.

== Proportion of stars with planets ==
Most stars are accompanied by planets, though the exact proportion remains uncertain due to current limitations in detecting distant exoplanets. Current research calculates that there is, on average, at least one planet per star. One in five Sun-like stars (Note: For the purpose of this 1 in 5 statistic, "Sun-like" means G-type star. Data for Sun-like stars was not available so this statistic is an extrapolation from data about K-type stars) is expected to have an "Earth-sized" (Note: For the purpose of this 1 in 5 statistic, Earth-sized means 1–2 Earth radii) planet in the habitable zone. The radial-velocity method and the transit method (the two methods responsible for the vast majority of detected planets) are most sensitive to large planets in small orbits. Thus many known exoplanets are "Hot Jupiters", planets of Jovian mass or larger in very small orbits with periods of only a few days. A survey from 2005 on radial-velocity-detected planets found that about 1.2% of Sun-like stars have a 'Hot Jupiter', where "Sun-like star" refers to any main-sequence star of spectral classes late-F, G, or early-K without a close stellar companion. This 1.2% is more than double the frequency of 'Hot Jupiters' detected by the Kepler spacecraft, for which a possible reason is that the Kepler field of view is covering a different region of the Milky Way where the metallicity of stars is different. It is further estimated that 3% to 4.5% of Sun-like stars possess a giant planet with an orbital period of 100 days or less, where "giant planet" means a planet of at least 30 Earth masses.

It is known that small planets (of roughly Earth-like mass or slightly larger) are more common than giant planets. It also appears that there are more planets in large orbits than in small orbits. Based on this, it is estimated that about 20% of Sun-like stars have at least one giant planet, whereas at least 40% may have planets of lower mass. A 2012 study of gravitational microlensing data collected between 2002 and 2007 concludes the proportion of stars with planets is much higher and estimates an average of 1.6 planets orbiting between 0.5 and 10 AU per star in the Milky Way. The authors of this study conclude that "stars are orbited by planets as a rule, rather than the exception". In November 2013, it was announced that 22%±8% of Sun-like stars have an Earth-sized planet in the habitable (Note: For the purpose of this 1 in 5 statistic, "habitable zone" means the region with 0.25 to 4 times Earth's stellar flux (corresponding to 0.5–2 AU for the Sun).) zone.

Regardless of the proportion of stars with planets, the total number of exoplanets must be very large. Since the Milky Way has at least 100 billion stars, it should also contain tens or hundreds of billions of planets.

== Type of star, spectral classification ==
The Morgan-Keenan spectral classification

Most known exoplanets orbit stars roughly similar to the Sun, that is, main-sequence stars of spectral categories F, G, or K. One reason is that planet-search programs have tended to concentrate on such stars. In addition, statistical analyses indicate that lower-mass stars (red dwarfs, of spectral category M) are less likely to have planets massive enough to be detected by the radial-velocity method. Nevertheless, many planets around red dwarfs have been discovered by the Kepler space telescope by the transit method, which can detect smaller planets.

Stars of spectral category A typically rotate very quickly, which makes it very difficult to measure the small Doppler shifts induced by orbiting planets because the spectral lines are very broad. However, this type of massive star eventually evolves into a cooler red giant that rotates more slowly and thus can be measured using the radial-velocity method. A few tens of planets have been found around red giants.

Observations using the Spitzer Space Telescope indicate that extremely massive stars of spectral category O, which are much hotter than the Sun, produce a photo-evaporation effect that inhibits planetary formation. When the O-type star goes supernova any planets that had formed would become free-floating due to the loss of stellar mass unless the natal kick of the resulting remnant pushes it in the same direction as an escaping planet. Fallback disks of matter that failed to escape orbit during a supernova may form planets around neutron stars and black holes.

Doppler surveys around a wide variety of stars indicate about 1 in 6 stars having twice the mass of the Sun are orbited by one or more Jupiter-sized planets, vs. 1 in 16 for Sun-like stars and only 1 in 50 for red dwarfs. On the other hand, microlensing surveys indicate that long-period Neptune-mass planets are found around 1 in 3 red dwarfs. Kepler Space Telescope observations of planets with up to one year periods show that occurrence rates of Earth- to Neptune-sized planets (1 to 4 Earth radii) around M, K, G, and F stars are successively higher towards cooler, less massive stars.

At the low-mass end of star-formation are sub-stellar objects that do not fuse hydrogen: the brown dwarfs and sub-brown dwarfs, of spectral classification L, T and Y. Planets and protoplanetary disks have been discovered around brown dwarfs, and disks have been found around sub-brown dwarfs (e.g. OTS 44).

Rogue planets ejected from their system could retain a system of satellites.

== Metallicity ==
Ordinary stars are composed mainly of the light elements hydrogen and helium. They also contain a small proportion of heavier elements, and this fraction is referred to as a star's metallicity (even if the elements are not metals in the traditional sense), denoted [m/H] and expressed on a logarithmic scale where zero is the Sun's metallicity. Stars with a higher metallicity are more likely to have planets, especially giant planets, than stars with lower metallicity.

A 2012 study of the Kepler space telescope data found that smaller planets, with radii smaller than Neptune's were found around stars with metallicities in the range −0.6 < [m/H] < +0.5 (about four times less than that of the Sun to three times more), (Note: Converting log scale [m/H] to multiple of solar metallicity: [(10^{−0.6} ≈ 1/4), (10^{0.5} ≈ 3)]) whereas larger planets were found mostly around stars with metallicities at the higher end of this range (at solar metallicity and above). In this study small planets occurred about three times as frequently as large planets around stars of metallicity greater than that of the Sun, but they occurred around six times as frequently for stars of metallicity less than that of the Sun. The lack of gas giants around low-metallicity stars could be because the metallicity of protoplanetary disks affects how quickly planetary cores can form and whether they accrete a gaseous envelope before the gas dissipates. However, Kepler can only observe planets very close to their star and the detected gas giants probably migrated from further out, so a decreased efficiency of migration in low-metallicity disks could also partly explain these findings.

A 2014 study found that not only giant planets, but planets of all sizes have an increased occurrence rate around metal-rich stars compared to metal-poor stars, although the larger the planet, the greater this increase as the metallicity increases. The study divided planets into three groups based on radius: gas giants, gas dwarfs, and terrestrial planets with the dividing lines at 1.7 and 3.9 Earth radii. For these three groups the planet occurrence rates are 9.30, 2.03, and 1.72 times higher for metal-rich stars than for metal-poor stars, respectively. There is a bias against detecting smaller planets because metal-rich stars tend to be larger, making it more difficult to detect smaller planets, which means that these increases in occurrence rates are lower limits.

It has also been shown that Sun-like stars with planets are much more likely to be deficient in lithium, although this correlation is not seen at all in other types of stars. However, this claimed relationship has become a point of contention in the planetary astrophysics community, being frequently denied but also supported.

A 2025 study found that short-period small planets with high mutual inclinations are more common around metal-rich Stars.

== Rotation ==
Planet-hosting stars rotate on average 1.63±0.40 days slower than stars without detected planets. There is a lack of close-in planets around rapidly rotating stars: Only slowly spinning stars with rotation periods longer than 5–10 days host planets on orbits shorter than 2 or 3 days, although the reason for this is not clear.

== Temperature ==
Hot Jupiters orbiting cooler stars tend to orbit in the same plane as stellar rotation, while those orbiting hotter stars are more likely to be misaligned. See Kraft break.

== Multiple stars ==
Stellar multiplicity increases with stellar mass: the likelihood of stars being in multiple systems is about 25% for red dwarfs, about 45% for Sun-like stars, and rises to about 80% for the most massive stars. Of the multiple stars about 75% are binaries and the rest are higher-order multiplicities.

More than one hundred planets have been discovered orbiting one member of a binary star system (e.g. 55 Cancri, possibly Alpha Centauri Bb), and several circumbinary planets have been discovered which orbit around both members of a binary star (e.g. PSR B1620-26 b, Kepler-16b). A few dozen planets in triple star systems are known (e.g. 16 Cygni Bb) and one in quadruple systems Kepler 64.

The Kepler results indicate circumbinary planetary systems are relatively common (as of October 2013 the spacecraft had found seven circumbinary planets out of roughly 1000 eclipsing binaries searched). One puzzling finding is that although half of the binaries have an orbital period of 2.7 days or less, none of the binaries with circumbinary planets have a period less than 7.4 days. Another surprising Kepler finding is circumbinary planets tend to orbit their stars close to the critical instability radius (theoretical calculations indicate the minimum stable separation is roughly two to three times the size of the stars' separation).

In 2014, from statistical studies of searches for companion stars, it was inferred that around half of exoplanet host stars have a companion star, usually within 100AU. This means that many exoplanet host stars that were thought to be single are binaries, so in many cases it is not known which of the stars a planet actually orbits, and the published parameters of transiting planets could be significantly incorrect because the planet radius and distance from star are derived from the stellar parameters. Follow-up studies with imaging (such as speckle imaging) are needed to find or rule out companions (and radial velocity techniques would be required to detect binaries really close together) and this has not yet been done for most exoplanet host stars. Examples of known binary stars where it is not known which of the stars a planet orbits are Kepler-132 and Kepler-296, although a 2015 study found that the Kepler-296 planets were likely orbiting the brighter star.

== Open clusters ==
Most stars form in open clusters, but very few planets have been found in open clusters and this led to the hypothesis that the open-cluster environment hinders planet formation. However, a 2011 study concluded that there have been an insufficient number of surveys of clusters to make such a hypothesis. The lack of surveys was because there are relatively few suitable open clusters in the Milky Way. Recent discoveries of both giant planets and low-mass planets in open clusters are consistent with there being similar planet occurrence rates in open clusters as around field stars.

The open cluster NGC 6811 contains two known planetary systems Kepler-66 and Kepler-67.
