= Kepler-68d =

Gas giant

Discovery
- Discovery date: February 12, 2013
- Detection method: Radial velocity

Orbital characteristics
- Periastron: 1.148 AU
- Apoastron: 1.652 AU
- Semi-major axis: 1.4±0.03 AU
- Eccentricity: 0.18 ± 0.05
- Orbital period (sidereal): 580±50 d

Physical characteristics
- Mass: ≥0.947 Mj

Kepler-68d is a gas giant with a minimum mass about the same as Jupiter. It is at least a jovian-mass planet orbiting 1.4 astronomical units from its parent star, Kepler-68, well within the habitable zone of the star. It was detected by radial velocity.

After planets Kepler-68b and c were detected by observing planetary transits in front of its star, doppler spectroscopy measurements were used to make follow-up observations of the star. Kepler-68d was discovered using that method.
