= RT Andromedae =

Star in the constellation Andromeda

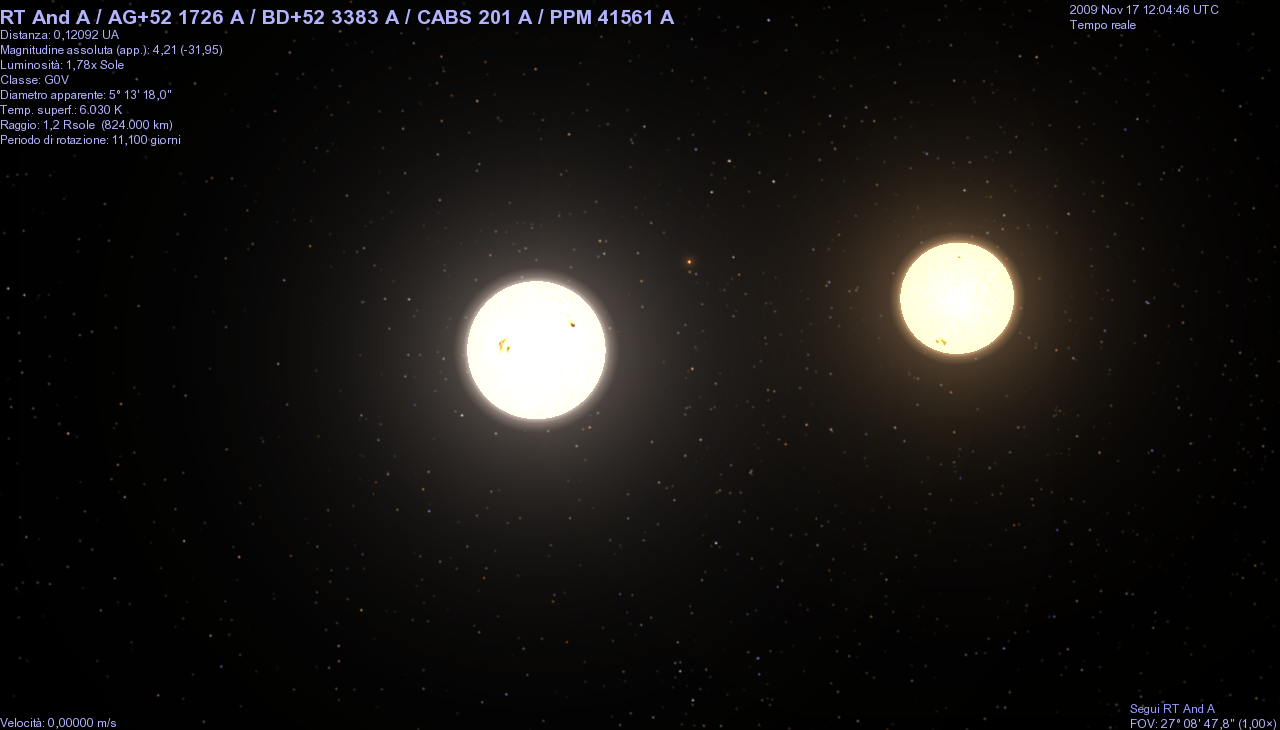
- RT Andromedae system.

Observation data Epoch J2000.0 Equinox ICRS
- Constellation: Andromeda
- Right ascension: 23^{h} 11^{m} 10.09841^{s}
- Declination: +53° 01′ 33.0313″
- Apparent magnitude (V): 9.043

Characteristics
- Spectral type: F8-G0V + K1-3V
- Variable type: RS CVn

Astrometry
Radial velocity (R_{v})	0.60±0.6 km/s
Proper motion (μ)	RA: −7.605 mas/yr Dec.: −21.777 mas/yr
Parallax (π)	10.1029±0.0176 mas
Distance	322.8 ± 0.6 ly (99.0 ± 0.2 pc)
Absolute bolometric magnitude (M_{bol})	5.707 / 4.079

Orbit
Period (P)	0.62893095 ± 0.00000009 d
Semi-major axis (a)	0.01787 AU (3.839 R_{☉})
Eccentricity (e)	0.0049 ± 0.0005
Inclination (i)	87.26 ± 0.07°
Periastron epoch (T)	JD 2436697.857

Details

RT And A
Mass	1.088 ± 0.030 M_{☉}
Radius	1.286 ± 0.011 R_{☉}
Temperature	6,150 ± 132 K

RT And B
Mass	0.837 ± 0.030 M_{☉}
Radius	0.956 ± 0.012 R_{☉}
Temperature	4,780 K

Other designations
- RT And, GSC 03998-02167, HIP 114484, TYC 3998-2167-1, BD+52° 3383a, GCRV 14555, 2MASS J23111009+5301330

Database references
SIMBAD	data

RT Andromedae is a variable star in the constellation of Andromeda. The system is estimated to be 323 light-years (99.0 parsecs) away.

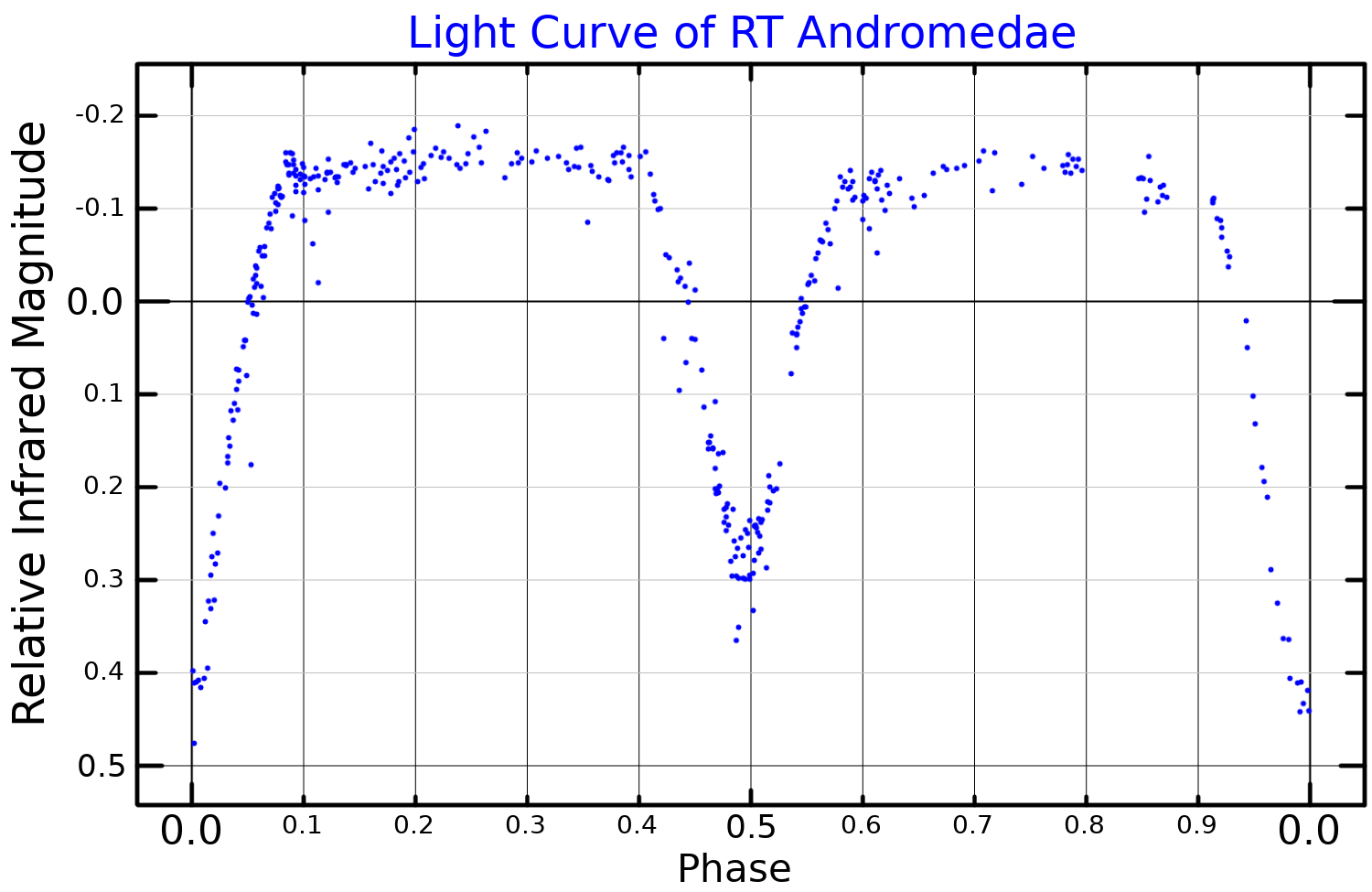
The Infrared (K band) light curve of RT Andromedae plotted from data presented in Arévalo & Lázaro (1995)

RT Andromedae is classified as a RS Canum Venaticorum variable, a type of close eclipsing binary star. It varies from an apparent visual magnitude of 9.83 at minimum brightness to a magnitude of 8.97 at maximum brightness, with a period of 0.6289216 days. The system consists of a G-type main-sequence star slightly more massive than the Sun, and a K-type main-sequence star slightly less massive; the light curve of this eclipsing binary exhibits secular variations of period and minima.

== Presence of a third body ==
According to Pribulla et al. (2000), the changes in variability could be ascribed to a third object in the system, with even a possible fourth. Its minimum mass is estimated to be 5 percent the mass of the Sun (roughly 50 times the mass of Jupiter), with an orbital period close to 75 years and an eccentricity that is thought to be fairly high (at 0.56). Such an object could likely turn out to be a brown dwarf or even a massive jovian planet. However, a recent paper of Manzoori (2009) noticed that there is a decreasing trend in the orbital period, so magnetic braking could explain better the evolution of this orbital system.
