= Magnetic braking =

Magnetic braking may refer to:

- Magnetic braking (astronomy), the loss of a star's angular momentum due to its magnetic field
- Eddy current brake, the use of magnetic induction to stop or slow a moving object
