= Kepler-89 =

Star in the constellation Cygnus

Observation data Epoch J2000 Equinox ICRS
- Constellation: Cygnus
- Right ascension: 19^{h} 49^{m} 19.9343^{s}
- Declination: +41° 53′ 28.006″
- Apparent magnitude (V): 12.4

Characteristics
- Evolutionary stage: main sequence
- Spectral type: F8 IV-V

Astrometry
| Proper motion (μ) | RA: 2.063(10) mas/yr Dec.: 1.337(11) mas/yr |
| Parallax (π) | 2.1069±0.0086 mas |
| Distance | 1,548 ± 6 ly (475 ± 2 pc) |

Details
| Mass | 1.25+0.03 −0.04 M_{☉} |
| Radius | 1.61+0.11 −0.12 R_{☉} |
| Surface gravity (log g) | 4.123±0.055 cgs |
| Temperature | 6,116 K |
| Metallicity [Fe/H] | −0.01±0.04 dex |
| Rotational velocity (v sin i) | 7.33±0.32 km/s |
| Age | 3.9+0.3 −0.2 Gyr |

Other designations
- KOI-94, KIC 6462863, 2MASS J19491993+4153280, Gaia DR2 2076970047474270208

Database references
| SIMBAD | data |
| Exoplanet Archive | data |
| KIC | data |

Kepler-89 is a star with four confirmed planets. Kepler-89 is a possible wide binary star.

== Planetary system ==
The discovery of four planets orbiting the star was announced October 2012 by analyzing data gathered by Kepler space telescope. Follow-up radial velocity measurements confirmed the existence of Kepler-89d, indicating that Kepler-89d is slightly larger and more massive than Saturn. In October 2013, other three planets were confirmed with Kepler-89c and Kepler-89e getting reasonable mass constraints. Transit-timing variations of the outermost planet suggest that additional planets or minor bodies are present in the system.

In 2012, a partial transit of the second outermost planet by the outermost planet was reported. This was the first time a planet-planet transit in front of the star was detected. This allowed to determine the mutual inclination of the planets d and e to be 1.15°.

Stephen R. Kane did a dynamical analysis of the Kepler-89 system that demonstrated that planets c and d, although close to the 2:1 secular resonance, are not permanently in a 2:1 resonance configuration.

The Kepler-89 planetary system
| Companion (in order from star) | Mass | Semimajor axis (AU) | Orbital period (days) | Eccentricity | Inclination (°) | Radius |
|---|---|---|---|---|---|---|
| b | <10.5 M_{🜨} | 0.05 | 3.7 | — | 89.3 | 0.13 R_{J} |
| c | 7.3-11.8 M_{🜨} | 0.099 | 10.4 | <0.1 | 88.36 | 0.31 R_{J} |
| d | 0.33±0.034 M_{J} | 0.165 | 22.3 | <0.1 | 89.871 | 0.83 R_{J} |
| e | 11.9-15.5 M_{🜨} | 0.298 | 54.3 | <0.1 | 89.76 | 0.49 R_{J} |
