= Kepler-62 =

K-type star in the constellation Lyra

- Location of Kepler-62 (circled in red)

Observation data Epoch J2000 Equinox ICRS
- Constellation: Lyra
- Right ascension: 18^{h} 52^{m} 51.05185^{s}
- Declination: +45° 20′ 59.3996″
- Apparent magnitude (V): ≈14.4 (Kp = 13.75)

Characteristics
- Evolutionary stage: Main sequence
- Spectral type: K2V
- B−V color index: 0.832

Astrometry
Radial velocity (R_{v})	17.51±1.84 km/s
Proper motion (μ)	RA: −25.120 mas/yr Dec.: −31.141 mas/yr
Parallax (π)	3.3209±0.0112 mas
Distance	982 ± 3 ly (301 ± 1 pc)
Absolute magnitude (M_{V})	6.17

Details
Mass	0.764±0.011 M_{☉}
Radius	0.660±0.018 R_{☉}
Luminosity	0.2565±0.0045 L_{☉}
Surface gravity (log g)	4.683±0.023 cgs
Temperature	5062±71 K
Metallicity [Fe/H]	−0.37 ± 0.04 dex
Rotation	39.3 ± 0.6 days
Rotational velocity (v sin i)	0.4 ± 0.5 km/s
Age	7 ± 4 Gyr

Other designations
- KIC 9002278, Kepler-62, KOI-701, TIC 164458488, 2MASS J18525105+4520595

Database references
SIMBAD	data
Exoplanet Archive	data

Kepler-62 is a K-type main-sequence star cooler and smaller than the Sun, located 982 light-years (301 parsecs) from Earth in the constellation Lyra. It resides within the field of vision of the Kepler spacecraft, the satellite that NASA's Kepler Mission used to detect planets that may be transiting their stars. On April 18, 2013, it was announced that the star has five planets, two of which, Kepler-62e and Kepler-62f are within the star's habitable zone. The outermost, Kepler-62f, is likely a rocky planet.

== Nomenclature and history ==
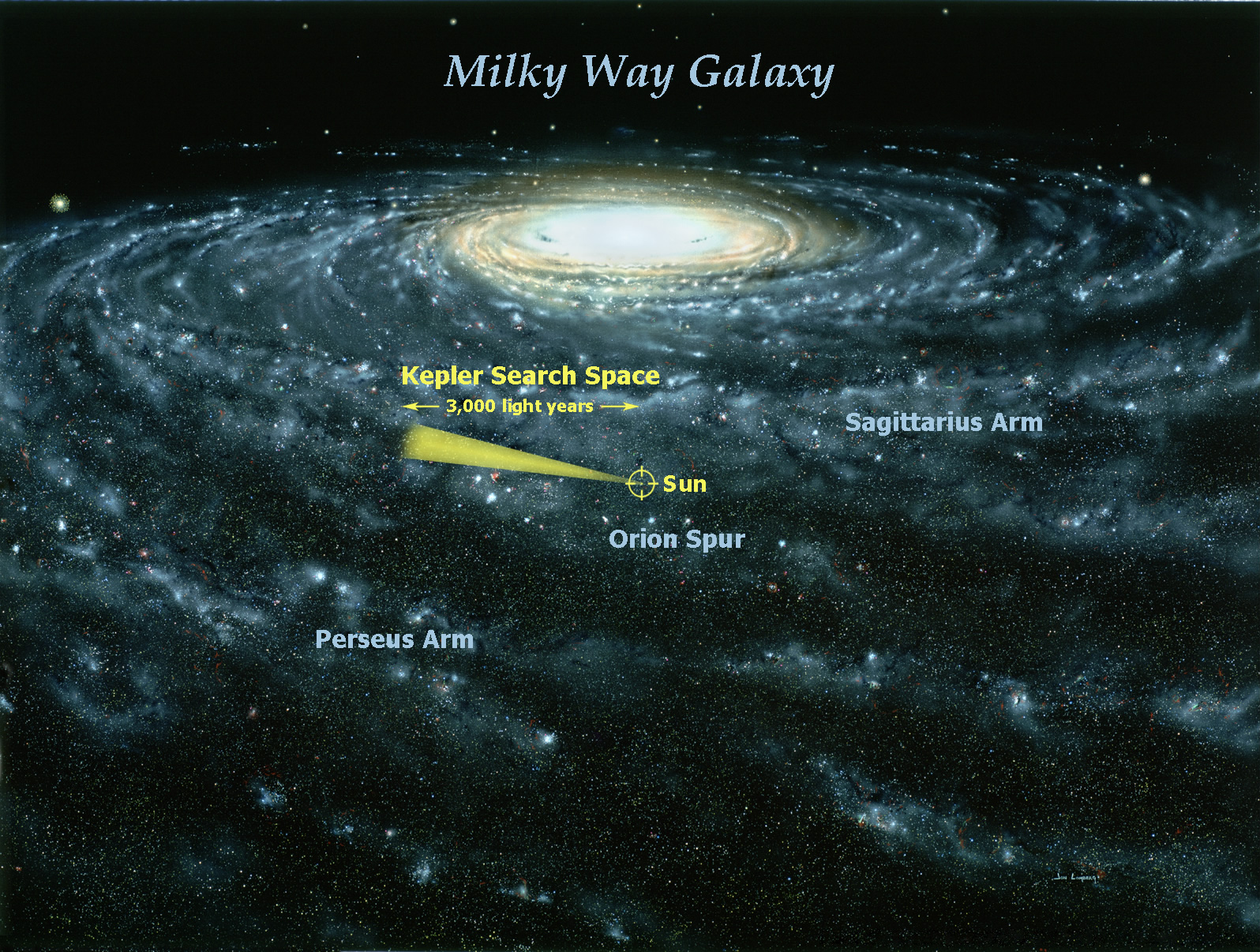
The Kepler Space Telescope search volume, in the context of the Milky Way Galaxy.

Prior to Kepler observation, Kepler-62 had the 2MASS catalogue number 2MASS J18525105+4520595. In the Kepler Input Catalog it has the designation of KIC 9002278, and when it was found to have transiting planet candidates it was given the Kepler object of interest number of KOI-701.

Planetary candidates were detected around the star by NASA's Kepler Mission, a mission tasked with discovering planets in transit around their stars. The transit method that Kepler uses involves detecting dips in brightness in stars. These dips in brightness can be interpreted as planets whose orbits pass in front of their stars from the perspective of Earth, although other phenomena can also be responsible which is why the term planetary candidate is used.

Following the acceptance of the discovery paper, the Kepler team provided an additional moniker for the system of "Kepler-62". The discoverers referred to the star as Kepler-62, which is the normal procedure for naming the exoplanets discovered by the spacecraft. Hence, this is the name used by the public to refer to the star and its planets.

Candidate planets that are associated with stars studied by the Kepler Mission are assigned the designations ".01", ".02", ".03", ".04", ".05" etc. after the star's name, in the order of discovery. If planet candidates are detected simultaneously, then the ordering follows the order of orbital periods from shortest to longest. Following these rules, the first three candidate planets were detected simultaneously, with orbital periods of 18.16406, 5.714932, and 122.3874 days, respectively, in the 2011 data release, with another two candidate planets, with orbital periods of 267.29 and 12.4417 days, respectively, being detected in a 2012 data release by the Kepler spacecraft.

The designations b, c, d, e, and f derive from the order of discovery. The designation of b is given to the first planet orbiting a given star, followed by the other lowercase letters of the alphabet. In the case of Kepler-62, all of the known planets in the system were announced at one time, so b is applied to the closest planet to the star and f to the farthest. The name Kepler-62 derives directly from the fact that the star is the catalogued 62nd star discovered by Kepler to have confirmed planets.

== Stellar characteristics ==
Kepler-62 is a K-type main sequence star that is approximately 69% the mass of and 64% the radius of the Sun. It has a temperature of 4925 K and is 7 billion years old. In comparison, the Sun is about 4.6 billion years old and has a temperature of 5778 K.

The star is somewhat poor in metals, with a metallicity ([Fe/H]) of about –0.37, or about 42% of the amount of iron and other heavier metals found in the Sun, which is similar to that of Kepler-442. The star's luminosity is typical for a star like Kepler-62, with a luminosity of around 21% of that of the solar luminosity.

The star's apparent magnitude, or how bright it appears from Earth's perspective, is 13.75. Therefore, it is too dim to be seen with the naked eye.

== Planetary system ==
The Kepler-62 planetary system
Companion (in order from star)	Mass	Semimajor axis (AU)	Orbital period (days)	Eccentricity	Inclination (°)	Radius
b	<9 M_{🜨}	0.0553 ± 0.0005	5.71493 ± 0.00001	—	89.2 ± 0.4	1.31 ± 0.04 R_{🜨}
c	<4 M_{🜨}	0.093 ± 0.001	12.4417 ± 0.00001	—	89.7 ± 0.2	0.54 ± 0.03 R_{🜨}
d	<14 M_{🜨}	0.120 ± 0.001	18.16406 ± 0.00002	—	89.7 ± 0.3	1.95 ± 0.07 R_{🜨}
e	<36 M_{🜨}	0.427 ± 0.004	122.3874 ± 0.0008	—	89.98 ± 0.02	1.670±0.051 R_{🜨}
f	<35 M_{🜨}	0.718 ± 0.007	267.29 ± 0.005	—	89.9 ± 0.03	1.461±0.070 R_{🜨}

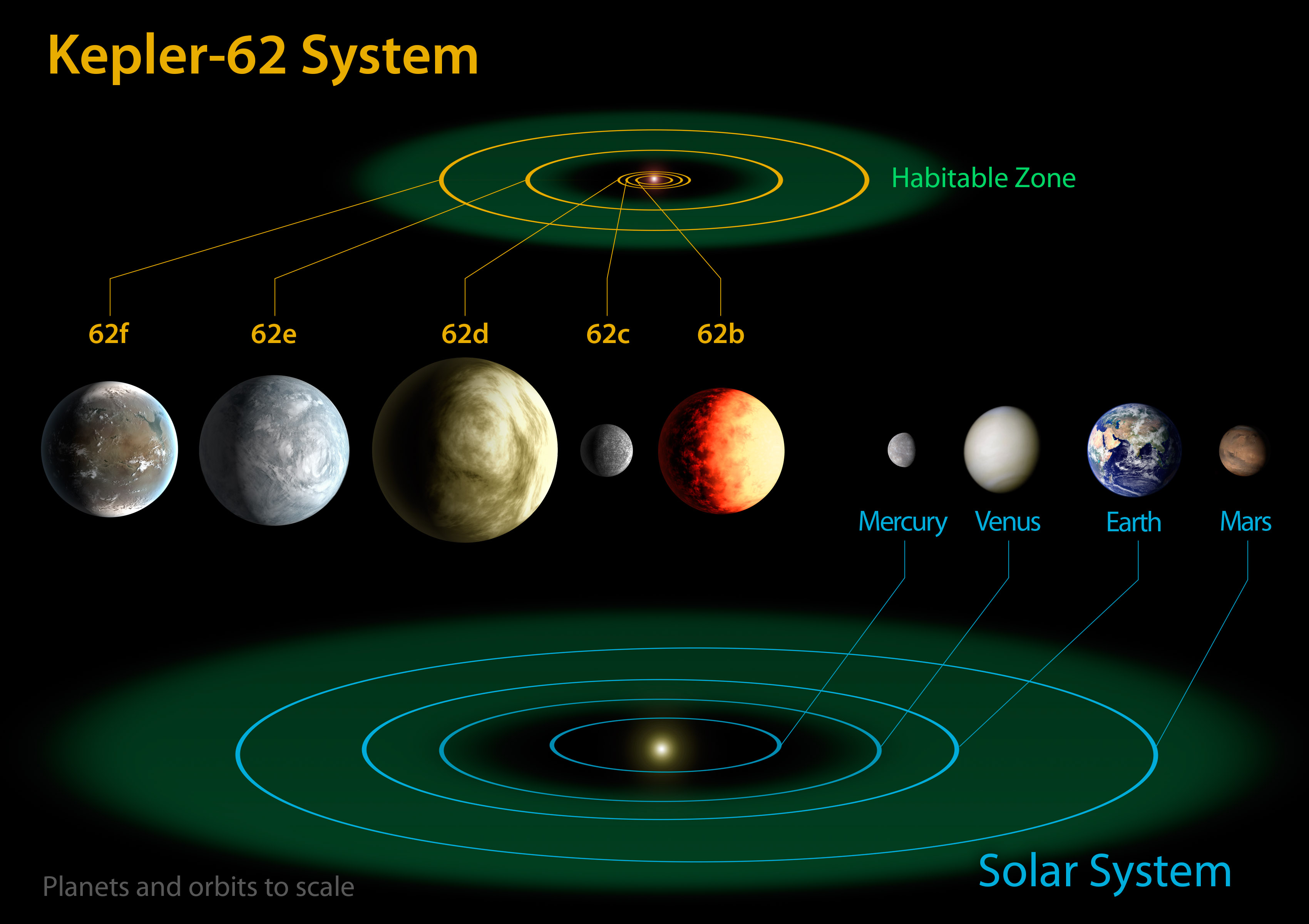
Artist's impressions of the Kepler-62 system (sizes to scale) compared to the planets of the inner Solar System with their respective habitable zones.

All known planets transit the star; this means that all five planets' orbits appear to cross in front of their star as viewed from the Earth's perspective. Their inclinations relative to Earth's line of sight, or how far above or below the plane of sight they are, vary by less than one degree. This allows direct measurements of the planets' periods and relative diameters (compared to the host star) by monitoring each planet's transit of the star. The exact eccentricity of the planets are not known but estimates place it very close to 0, giving the planets a mostly circular orbit.

The radii of the planets fall between 0.54 and 1.95 Earth radii. Of particular interest are the planets e and f, as they were the best candidates for solid planets falling into the habitable zone of their star at the time of discovery. Their radii, 1.61 and 1.41 Earth radii respectively, put them in a radius range where they may be solid terrestrial planets. Their positions within the Kepler-62 system mean that they fall within Kepler-62's habitable zone: the distance range where, for a given chemical composition (significant amounts of carbon dioxide for Kepler-62f, and a protective cloud cover for Kepler-62e), these two planets could have liquid water on their surfaces, perhaps completely covering them. The masses of the planets could not be directly determined using either the radial velocity or the transit timing method; this failure leads to weak upper limits for the planets' masses. For e and f, that upper limit amounts to 36 and 35 Earth masses, respectively; the real masses are expected to be significantly lower. Based on composition models, the Planetary Habitability Laboratory estimated masses for the planets of 2.1, 0.1, 5.5, 3.6, and 2.6 M_{🜨}, respectively. The existence of an additional planet (at a distance of 0.22 AU, between Kepler-62e and Kepler-62f) of the Kepler-62 system was predicted, but no such planet has been detected. To keep this planetary system, which is highly sensitive to perturbations, stable, no additional giant planets can be located within 30 AU from the parent star.

== Gallery ==
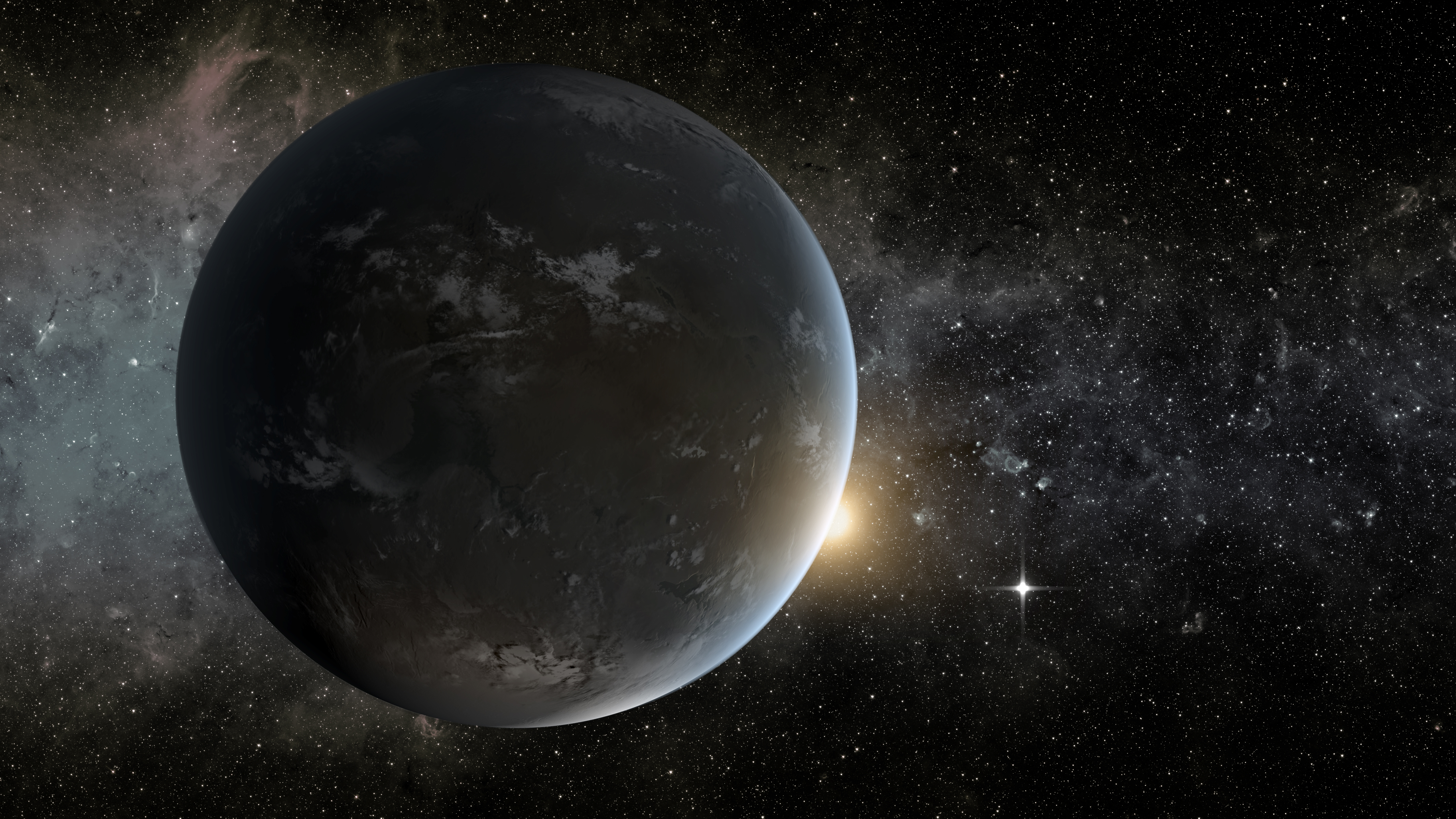
Kepler-62f (foreground) and Kepler-62e (right) depicted as habitable zone exoplanets orbiting the star Kepler-62 (center). (artist's illustration)

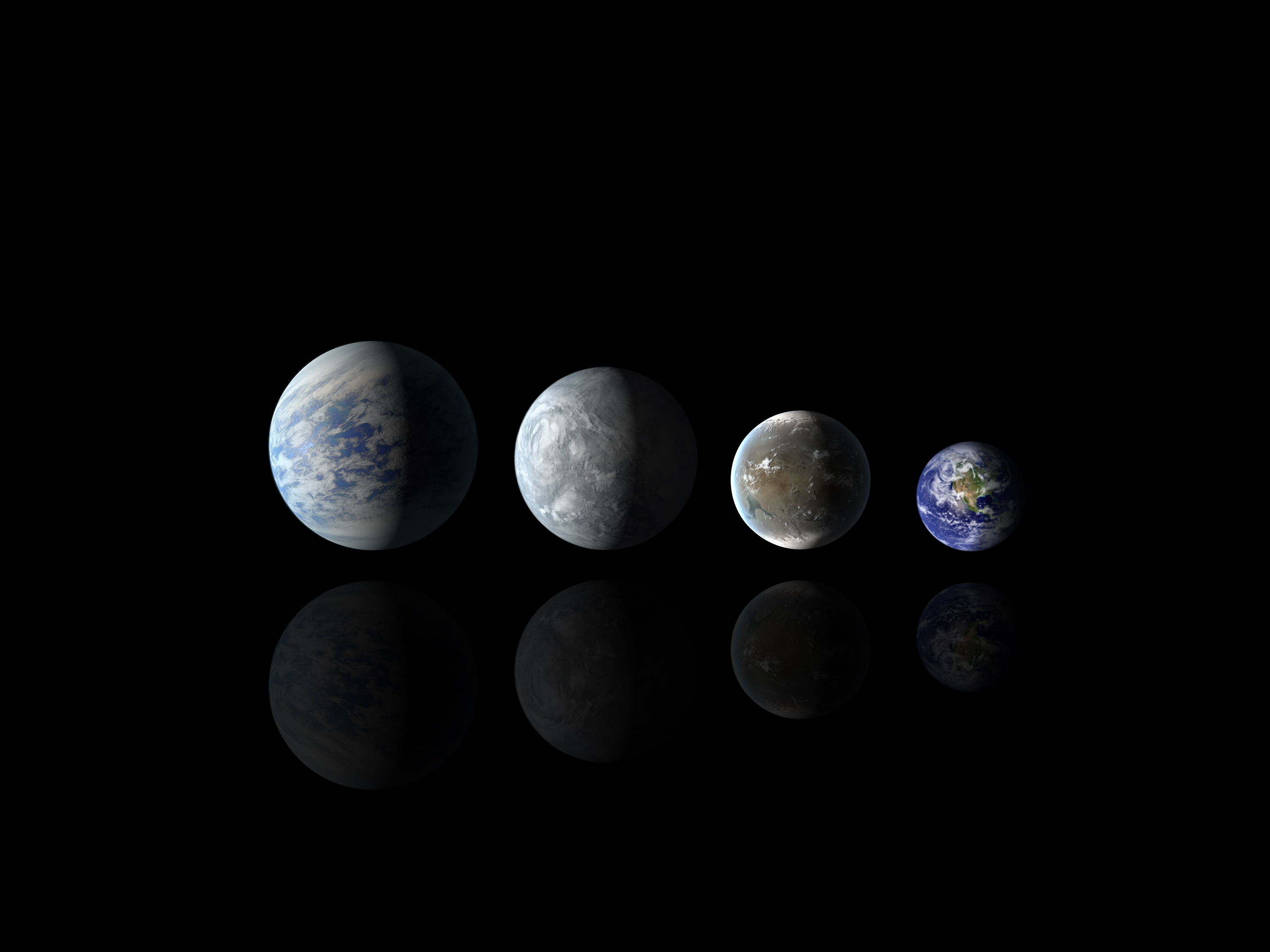
Comparison of the sizes of planets Kepler-69c, Kepler-62e, Kepler-62f, and the Earth. Exoplanets are artists' impressions.

== See also ==
- Kepler Mission
- List of planetary systems
