= Robert Kraft (astronomer) =

American astronomer (1927–2015)

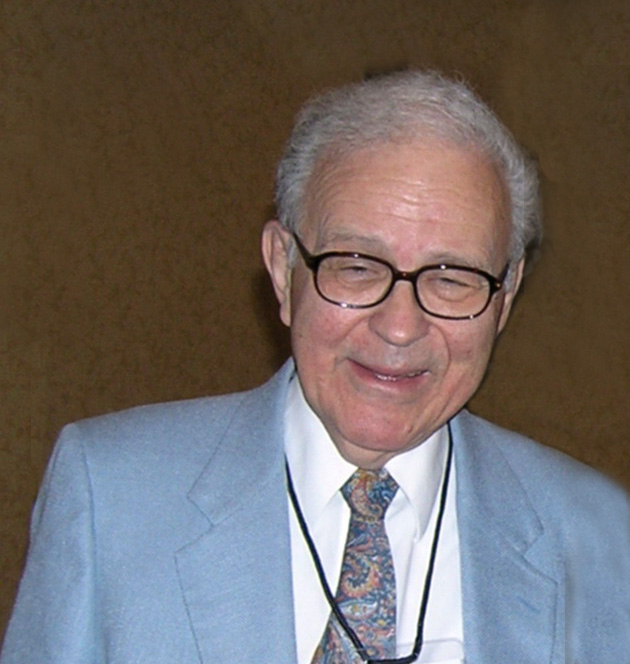
- Born: June 16, 1927; Seattle, Washington, U.S.
- Died: May 26, 2015 (aged 87); Santa Cruz, California
- Education: University of Washington, University of California at Berkeley
- Known for: Kraft break
- Scientific career
- Doctoral advisor: George Herbig

Robert Paul Kraft (June 16, 1927 – May 26, 2015) was an American astronomer. He performed pioneering work on Cepheid variables, stellar rotation, novae, and the chemical evolution of the Milky Way. His name is also associated with the Kraft break: the abrupt change in the average rotation rate of main sequence stars around spectral type F8.

== Career ==
Kraft received his B.S. at the University of Washington in 1947, M.S. in mathematics at the University of Washington in 1949, and PhD from the University of California, Berkeley.

Kraft began working at University of California, Santa Cruz in 1967, where he served as director of the Lick Observatory from 1981–1991. During this time, he oversaw the observatory and university's involvement in the construction of the W.M. Keck Observatory in Hawaii. He also served as president of the American Astronomical Society (1974–1976) and president of the International Astronomical Union (1997–2000).

From 1956 until about 1965, he focused his research efforts on cataclysmic variables (CVs). In particular, he discovered that all of these stars are binary systems containing a low-mass star and a white dwarf.

Before his death in 2015, Kraft had focused his research on globular clusters and galactic halos, specifically differences between stars in the two regions.

== Honors ==
=== Awards ===
- Helen B. Warner Prize for Astronomy (1962)
- Henry Norris Russell Lectureship (1995)
- Bruce Medal (2005)
- National Academy of Sciences

=== Named after him ===
- Asteroid 3712 Kraft
