= Kepler-277 =

Star in Lyra

Observation data Epoch J2000.0 Equinox J2000.0
- Constellation: Lyra
- Right ascension: 19^{h} 06^{m} 19.95772^{s}
- Declination: +39° 04′ 37.8616″
- Apparent magnitude (V): 13.544

Characteristics
- Evolutionary stage: subgiant
- Spectral type: G1V-IV

Astrometry
| Radial velocity (R_{v}) | −62.35±1.85 km/s |
| Proper motion (μ) | RA: +5.818 mas/yr Dec.: +17.290 mas/yr |
| Parallax (π) | 1.0406±0.0106 mas |
| Distance | 3,130 ± 30 ly (961 ± 10 pc) |
| Absolute magnitude (M_{V}) | 3.39 |

Details
| Mass | 1.263+0.031 −0.076 M_{☉} |
| Radius | 1.714+0.029 −0.026 R_{☉} |
| Luminosity | 3.70 L_{☉} |
| Temperature | 5914 K |
| Metallicity [Fe/H] | 0.100 dex |
| Age | 4.07 Gyr |

Other designations
- Kepler-277, KOI-1215, KIC 3939150, 2MASS J19061996+3904379

Database references
| SIMBAD | data |
| Exoplanet Archive | data |

Kepler-277 is a large yellow star about 961 ± 10 parsecs (3,134 ± 33 ly) away in the constellation of Lyra. It is 1.69 R_{☉} and 1.12 M_{☉}, with a temperature of 5946 K, a metallicity of -0.315 [Fe/H], and an unknown age. For comparison, the Sun has a temperature of 5778 K, a metallicity of 0.00 [Fe/H], and an age of about 4.5 billion years. The large radius in comparison to its mass and temperature suggest that Kepler-277 could be a subgiant star.

== Planetary system ==
Kepler-277 hosts two exoplanets, detected in 2014 via the transit method. Named Kepler-277b and Kepler-277c, they are mega-Earths, notable for their unusually high estimated masses and densities. A 2025 study speculated that additional, undetected non-transiting planets may bias the transit-timing variation analysis used to estimate the planets' masses.

The Kepler-277 planetary system
| Companion (in order from star) | Mass | Semimajor axis (AU) | Orbital period (days) | Eccentricity | Inclination (°) | Radius |
|---|---|---|---|---|---|---|
| b | 33.6+15.1 −8.2 M_{🜨} | 0.142 | 17.324161(44) | — | — | 2.92+0.73 −0.63 R_{🜨} |
| c | 40.4+9.4 −7.0 M_{🜨} | 0.218 | 33.00672(10) | — | — | 3.36+0.83 −0.72 R_{🜨} |

== See also ==
- List of stars in Lyra
