= Kepler-68 =

Star in the constellation Cygnus

Observation data Epoch J2000 Equinox ICRS
- Constellation: Cygnus
- Right ascension: 19^{h} 24^{m} 07.76597^{s}
- Declination: +49° 02′ 24.9283″
- Apparent magnitude (V): 10.08

Characteristics
- Evolutionary stage: Main sequence
- Spectral type: G1V

Astrometry
Radial velocity (R_{v})	−20.50±0.23 km/s
Proper motion (μ)	RA: −7.305 mas/yr Dec.: −10.454 mas/yr
Parallax (π)	6.9298±0.0100 mas
Distance	470.7 ± 0.7 ly (144.3 ± 0.2 pc)

Details
Mass	1.057+0.022 −0.020 M_{☉}
Radius	1.2564±0.0084 R_{☉}
Luminosity	1.55 L_{☉}
Temperature	5847±75 K
Metallicity [Fe/H]	0.11±0.03 dex
Rotational velocity (v sin i)	2.4 km/s
Age	6.84+0.90 −1.04 Gyr

Other designations
- BD+48 2893, KOI-246, KIC 11295426, TYC 3551-189-1, GSC 03551-00189, 2MASS J19240775+4902249

Database references
SIMBAD	data
Exoplanet Archive	data
KIC	data

Kepler-68 is a Sun-like main sequence star located 471 light-years (144 parsecs) away in the constellation Cygnus. It is known to have at least four planets orbiting around it. The third planet has a mass similar to Jupiter but orbits within the habitable zone.

High resolution imaging observations of Kepler-68 carried out with the lucky imaging instrument AstraLux on the 2.2m telescope at Calar Alto Observatory detected a wide companion candidate approximately 11 arcseconds away. Comparing these observations to the 2MASS positions showed that the companion's proper motion appeared consistent with it being bound to the Kepler-68 system, but further observations were needed to confirm this conclusion. In 2019 this was found to be an unrelated background star using Gaia DR2 astrometry.

== Planetary system ==
Currently, four planets have been discovered to orbit around Kepler-68. The two innermost planets were discovered by the planetary transit method. Follow-up Doppler measurements helped to determine the mass of Kepler-68b and helped to discover Kepler-68d. There is an additional signal present in the radial velocity measurements indicating another body in the system at a period of greater than 10 years. The mass of this object was initially unknown and it could be either another planet or a stellar companion. In 2023, this fourth planet was confirmed, with a minimum mass about that of Saturn.

The Kepler-68 planetary system
Companion (in order from star)	Mass	Semimajor axis (AU)	Orbital period (days)	Eccentricity	Inclination (°)	Radius
b	8.03±0.67 M_{🜨}	0.06135±0.00043	5.39875259	<0.090	87.23+0.22 −0.17	2.357±0.023 R_{🜨}
c	<1.3 M_{🜨}	0.09008±0.00063	9.605027	<0.099	87.071+0.087 −0.094	0.979±0.019 R_{🜨}
d	≥0.749±0.017 M_{J}	1.469±0.010	632.62±1.03	0.102±0.016	—	—
e	≥0.272±0.032 M_{J}	4.60+0.32 −0.16	3455+348 −169	0.33±0.11	—	—
