= Kepler-62c =

Sub-Earth orbiting Kepler-62

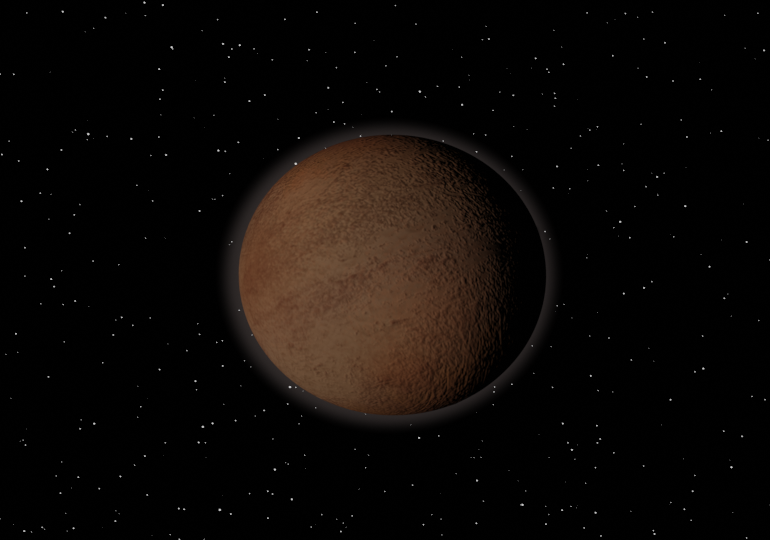

Discovery
- Discovered by: Borucki et al.
- Discovery site: Kepler Space Observatory
- Discovery date: 18 April 2013
- Detection method: Transit (Kepler Mission)

Orbital characteristics
- Semi-major axis: 0.0929 ± 0.0009 AU
- Eccentricity: ~0
- Orbital period (sidereal): 12.4417 ± 0.0001 d
- Inclination: 89.7 ± 0.2
- Star: Kepler-62 (KOI-701)

Physical characteristics
- Mean radius: 0.54 ± 0.03 R_{🜨}
- Mass: 0.1+3.9 −0.1 M_{🜨}
- Temperature: T_{eq}: 578 K (305 °C; 581 °F)

Kepler-62c (also known by its Kepler Object of Interest designation KOI-701.05) is an approximately Mars-sized exoplanet discovered in orbit around the star Kepler-62, the second innermost of five discovered by NASA's Kepler spacecraft around Kepler-62. At the time of discovery it was the second-smallest exoplanet discovered and confirmed by the Kepler spacecraft, after Kepler-37b. It was found using the transit method, in which the dimming that a planet causes as it crosses in front of its star is measured. Its stellar flux is 25 ± 3 times Earth's. It is similar to Mercury.

== Physical characteristics ==
=== Mass, radius and temperature ===
Kepler-62c is a sub-Earth, an exoplanet with a radius and mass smaller than Earth. It has an equilibrium temperature of 578 K (305 °C; 581 °F). It has a radius of 0.54 R_{🜨}. This is about the size of Mars, making it one of the smallest known exoplanets. However, the mass is currently not known, estimates place an upper limit of <4 M_{🜨}, the real mass is expected to be significantly lower than this, say around 0.1 M_{🜨}, comparable to the size of Kepler-37b.

=== Host star ===
The planet orbits a (K-type) star named Kepler-62, orbited by a total of five planets. The star has a mass of 0.69 M_{☉} and a radius of 0.64 R_{☉}. It has a temperature of 4925 K and is 7 billion years old. In comparison, the Sun is 4.6 billion years old and has a temperature of 5778 K. The star is somewhat metal-poor, with a metallicity ([Fe/H]) of −0.37, or 42% of the solar amount. Its luminosity (L_{☉}) is 21% that of the Sun.

The star's apparent magnitude, or how bright it appears from Earth's perspective, is 13.65. Therefore, it is too dim to be seen with the naked eye.

=== Orbit ===
Kepler-62c orbits its host star with an orbital period of 12 days at a distance of about 0.092 AU (compared to the distance of Mercury from the Sun, which is about 0.38 AU). It receives about 25 times more sunlight than Earth does from the Sun.

== Discovery ==
In 2009, NASA's Kepler spacecraft was completing observing stars on its photometer, the instrument it uses to detect transit events, in which a planet crosses in front of and dims its host star for a brief and roughly regular period of time. In this last test, Kepler observed 50000 stars in the Kepler Input Catalog, including Kepler-62; the preliminary light curves were sent to the Kepler science team for analysis, who chose obvious planetary companions from the bunch for follow-up at observatories. Observations for the potential exoplanet candidates took place between 13 May 2009 and 17 March 2012. After observing the respective transits, which for Kepler-62c occurred roughly every 12 days (its orbital period), it was eventually concluded that a planetary body was responsible for the periodic 12-day transits. The discovery, along with the planetary system of the star Kepler-69 were announced on April 18, 2013.
