= Gliese 163 c =

Goldilocks super-Earth orbiting Gliese 163

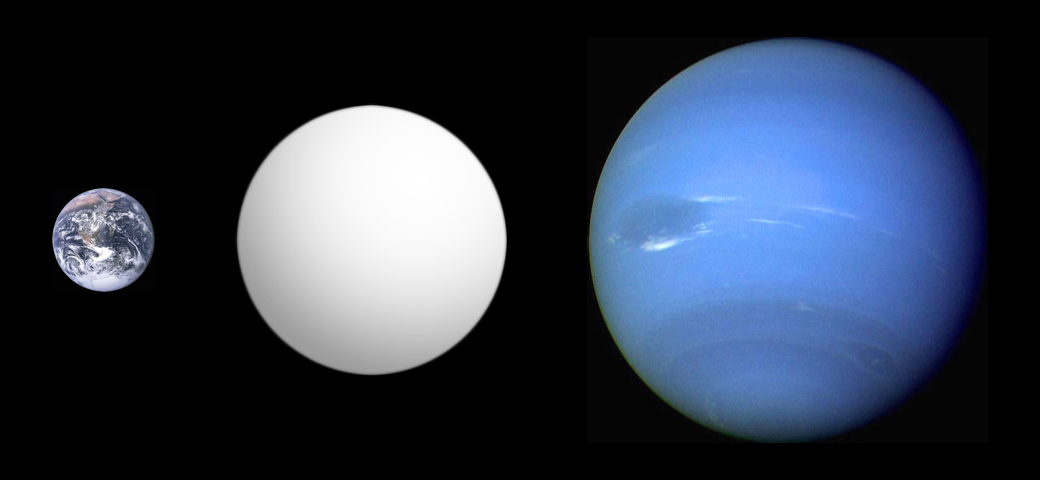

Discovery
- Discovered by: European HARPS team led by Xavier Bonfils
- Discovery site: UJF-Grenoble/CNRS-INSU, Institut de Planétologie et d’Astrophysique of Grenoble, France.
- Discovery date: September 2012; September 20, 2012 (announced)
- Detection method: Radial velocity (HARPS)

Orbital characteristics
- Semi-major axis: 0.12536 ± 0.0001 AU (18,754,000 ± 15,000 km)
- Orbital period (sidereal): 25.631 ± 0.0235 d
- Star: Gliese 163

Physical characteristics
- Mean radius: 2.43 R_{🜨}
- Mass: 7.3 M_{🜨}
- Temperature: 277 K

Gliese 163 c (/ˈɡliːzə/) or Gl 163 c is a potentially habitable exoplanet, orbiting within the habitable zone of M dwarf star Gliese 163.

The parent star is 15.0 parsecs (approximately 49 light-years, or 465 trillion kilometers) from the Sun, in the constellation Dorado. Gliese 163 c is one of five planets discovered in the system. With a mass at least 7.2 times that of the Earth, it is classified as a super-Earth (a planet of roughly 1 to 10 Earth masses).

Size comparison
Earth	Gliese 163 c
	Exoplanet
