= Gliese 163 =

Red dwarf star in the constellation Dorado

Observation data Epoch J2000 Equinox ICRS
- Constellation: Dorado
- Right ascension: 04^{h} 09^{m} 15.66834^{s}
- Declination: −53° 22′ 25.2900″
- Apparent magnitude (V): 11.79

Characteristics
- Spectral type: M3.5V
- B−V color index: 1.480±0.008

Astrometry
| Radial velocity (R_{v}) | 58.30±0.24 km/s |
| Proper motion (μ) | RA: 1046.236±0.019 mas/yr Dec.: 584.166±0.023 mas/yr |
| Parallax (π) | 66.0705±0.0172 mas |
| Distance | 49.36 ± 0.01 ly (15.135 ± 0.004 pc) |
| Absolute magnitude (M_{V}) | 10.91 |

Details
| Mass | 0.405±0.010 M_{☉} |
| Radius | 0.409+0.017 −0.016 R_{☉} |
| Luminosity | 0.02163±0.00063 L_{☉} |
| Surface gravity (log g) | 4.87 cgs |
| Temperature | 3,460+76 −74 K |
| Metallicity [Fe/H] | 0.1±0.1 dex |
| Rotation | 61.0±0.3 d |
| Rotational velocity (v sin i) | 0.85 km/s |
| Age | 5 Gyr |

Other designations
- GJ 163, HIP 19394, LHS 188, LTT 1881

Database references
| SIMBAD | data |
| Exoplanet Archive | data |
| ARICNS | data |

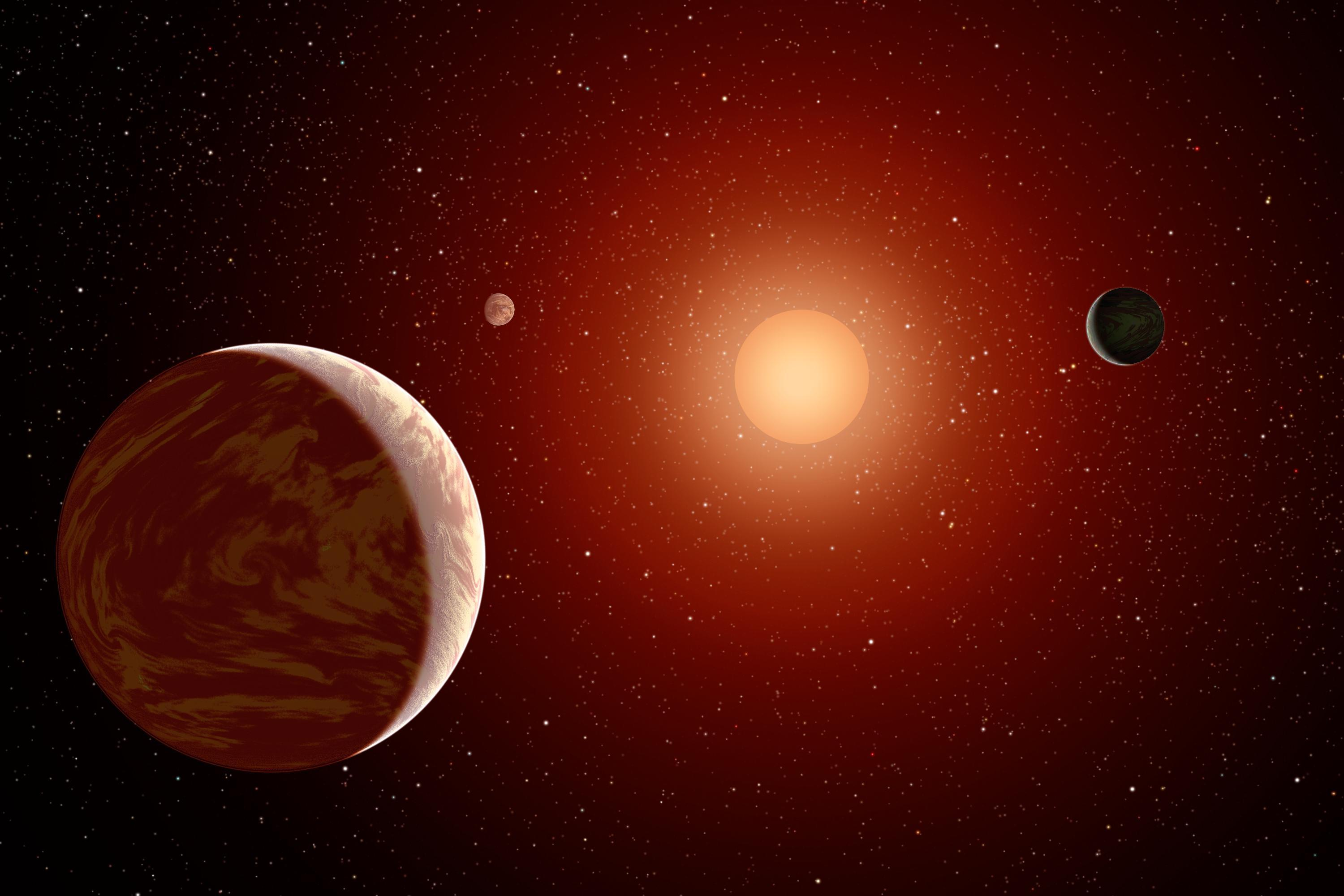
Planets Under a Red Sun

Gliese 163 is a faint red dwarf star with multiple exoplanetary companions in the southern constellation of Dorado. Other stellar catalog names for it include HIP 19394 and LHS 188. It is too faint to be visible to the naked eye, having an apparent visual magnitude of 11.79 and an absolute magnitude of 10.91. This system is located at a distance of 49.4 light-years from the Sun based on parallax measurements. Judging by its space velocity components, it is most likely a thick disk star.

This is a small M-type main-sequence star with a stellar classification of M3.5V. It has a relatively low activity level for a red dwarf of its mass, suggesting it is an old star with an age of at least two billion years. This star has 41% of the mass and radius of the Sun. It is spinning slowly with a projected rotational velocity of 0.85 km/s and has a rotation period of 61 days. The star is radiating just 2% of the luminosity of the Sun from its photosphere at an effective temperature of 3,460 K.

== Planetary system ==
In September 2012, astronomers using the HARPS instrument announced the discovery of two planets orbiting Gliese 163. The first planet, Gliese 163 b, is a super-Earth or mini-Neptune with an orbital period of 9 days, therefore far too hot to be considered habitable. However, Gliese 163 c, with an orbital period of 26 days and a minimum mass of 6.9 Earth masses, was considered to potentially be in the star's habitable zone, although it is hotter than Earth, with a temperature of 60 deg. C (140 deg. F). It has an eccentricity estimated to be about 0.03, giving it a fairly circular orbit. Evidence was also found for a third planet orbiting further out than c and b.

In June 2013, it was concluded that at least 3 planets orbit around the star with a fourth planet being a possibility, and in a paper submitted to arXiv in June 2019, that and another planet were possibly found, thus giving the system a total of five planets, but only the first three are confirmed.

The Gliese 163 planetary system
| Companion (in order from star) | Mass | Semimajor axis (AU) | Orbital period (days) | Eccentricity | Inclination (°) | Radius |
|---|---|---|---|---|---|---|
| b | ≥9.9±2.3 M_{🜨} | 0.060+0.005 −0.006 | 8.6312+0.0023 −0.0021 | 0.02+0.12 −0.02 | — | — |
| c | ≥7.6+2.9 −2.3 M_{🜨} | 0.124+0.010 −0.013 | 25.637±0.042 | 0.03+0.18 −0.03 | — | — |
| f (unconfirmed) | ≥6.8±4.4 M_{🜨} | 0.326+0.027 −0.034 | 109.5+1.6 −1.4 | 0.04+0.23 −0.04 | — | — |
| e (unconfirmed) | ≥13.6+8.2 −6.5 M_{🜨} | 0.700±0.066 | 349+12 −10 | 0.03+0.25 −0.03 | — | — |
| d | ≥20.2±7.6 M_{🜨} | 1.021+0.088 −0.118 | 604+29 −24 | 0.02+0.22 −0.02 | — | — |
