= WASP-100b =

Highly irradiated planet with hotspot

Discovery
- Discovery date: 2014
- Detection method: Transit

Orbital characteristics
- Semi-major axis: 0.04 AU
- Eccentricity: 0.0
- Orbital period (sidereal): 2.849380
- Inclination: 82.60
- Star: WASP-100

Physical characteristics
- Mass: 1.26 M_{J}

WASP-100b is a highly irradiated exoplanet belonging to the hot Jupiter class of planets. It orbits at a distance of 0.04 AU around a star named WASP-100 located around 1,188 light years from Earth. It has a mass of 1.26 Jupiters and a radius of 1.33 Jupiters.

The dayside temperature of WASP-100b has a maximum temperature of 2710 Kelvin. WASP-100b has a warm nightside temperature of 2380 Kelvin. It was also found that the planet has efficient heat redistribution which manifest itself as a substantial eastward hotspot.
