= Kepler-410 =

Binary star system in the constellation of Lyra

Observation data Epoch J2000 Equinox ICRS
- Constellation: Lyra
- A
- Right ascension: 18^{h} 52^{m} 36.1604^{s}
- Declination: +45° 08′ 23.346″
- Apparent magnitude (V): 9.50
- B
- Right ascension: 18^{h} 52^{m} 36.2518^{s}
- Declination: +45° 08′ 24.712″
- Apparent magnitude (V): 13.8

Characteristics

Kepler-410A
- Evolutionary stage: main sequence
- Spectral type: F6IV

Kepler-410B
- Evolutionary stage: main sequence
- Spectral type: K2

Astrometry

A
Radial velocity (R_{v})	−40.6±0.7 km/s
Proper motion (μ)	RA: 61.683 mas/yr Dec.: 61.673 mas/yr
Parallax (π)	6.7933±0.0109 mas
Distance	480.1 ± 0.8 ly (147.2 ± 0.2 pc)

B
Proper motion (μ)	RA: 61.679 mas/yr Dec.: 60.937 mas/yr
Parallax (π)	6.8007±0.0260 mas
Distance	480 ± 2 ly (147.0 ± 0.6 pc)

Position (relative to Kepler-410A)
Component	Kepler-410B
Angular distance	1.6672±0.0015″
Position angle	35.975±0.052°
Projected separation	245 AU

Details

Kepler-410A
Mass	1.223±0.054 M_{☉}
Radius	1.357±0.022 R_{☉}
Luminosity	2.66±0.16 L_{☉}
Surface gravity (log g)	4.28±0.02 cgs
Temperature	6325±75 K
Metallicity [Fe/H]	0.01±0.10 dex
Rotation	20.3^{+2.2}_{−1.3} d
Age	1.81±0.27 Gyr

Kepler-410B
Mass	0.728 M_{☉}
Radius	0.89^{+0.09}_{−0.03} R_{☉}

Other designations
- BD+44 3008, HD 175289, Kepler-410, KOI-42, KIC 8866102, TYC 3540-760-1, GSC 03540-00760, 2MASS J18523616+4508233
- Kepler-410A: Gaia EDR3 2106904148451706752
- Kepler-410B: Gaia EDR3 2106904148449360000

Database references
SIMBAD	data
- B

Kepler-410 is a binary star system. Its primary star, also known as Kepler-410A, is a F-type subgiant star, orbited by the orange dwarf star Kepler-410B on a wide orbit. The companion star was discovered in 2012.

The primary star's surface temperature is 6325±75 K. HD 175289 is similar to the Sun in its concentration of heavy elements, with a metallicity Fe/H index of 0.01±0.10, but is much younger at an age of 1.81±0.27 billion years.

== Planetary system ==
In 2013, one planet, named Kepler-410Ab, was discovered using the transit method. It is not known if the planet is orbiting the primary or secondary star. If orbiting the secondary, the planetary radius must be doubled. Immediately, a second non-transiting planet was suspected due to transit-timing variations, and a 2019 study also found evidence for such a planet, though it has not yet been confirmed or given any designation.

The Kepler-410A planetary system
Companion (in order from star)	Mass	Semimajor axis (AU)	Orbital period (days)	Eccentricity	Inclination (°)	Radius
b	—	0.14±0.01	17.833682±0.000012	0.17	90	2.48±0.07 R_{🜨}
c (unconfirmed)	0.165 M_{🜨}	—	26.5	—	—	—
