= Kepler-277b =

Rocky planet orbiting the star Kepler-277

Discovery
- Discovery site: Kepler Space Observatory
- Discovery date: 2014
- Detection method: Transit

Orbital characteristics
- Semi-major axis: ~0.136 AU
- Eccentricity: null
- Orbital period (sidereal): 17.324 d
- Inclination: null
- Star: Kepler-277

Physical characteristics
- Mean radius: 2.92 ^{+0.73}_{−0.63} R_{🜨}
- Mass: 87.3 ^{+41.7}_{−39.9} M_{🜨}
- Mean density: 19.33+39.9 −13.96 g cm^{−3}
- Surface gravity: 10.24+14.36 −6.68 g
- Temperature: 924 K (651 °C; 1,204 °F)

Kepler-277b (also known by its Kepler Objects of Interest designation KOI-1215.01) is the second most massive and third-largest rocky planet ever discovered, with a mass close to that of Saturn. Discovered in 2014 by the Kepler Space Telescope, Kepler-277b is a sub-Neptune sized exoplanet with a very high mass and density for an object of its radius, suggesting a composition made mainly of rock and iron. Along with its sister planet, Kepler-277c, the planet's mass was determined using transit-timing variations (TTVs).

== Characteristics ==
=== Size and temperature ===
Kepler-277b was detected using the transit method and TTVs, allowing for both its mass and radius to be determined to some level. It is approximately 2.92 R_{🜨}, between the size of Earth and Neptune. At that radius, most planets should be gaseous Mini-Neptunes with no solid surface. However, the mass of Kepler-277b is extremely high for its size. Transit-timing variations indicate a planetary mass of about 87.3 M_{🜨}, comparable to Saturn's mass at 95.16 M_{🜨}. The planet has a density of approximately 19.3 g/cm^{3} and about 10.4 times the surface gravity of Earth. Such a high density for an object of this size implies that, like its sister planet, Kepler-277b is an enormous rock-based planet. It is currently the second most massive and third largest terrestrial planet ever discovered, behind Kepler-277c in radius and PSR J1719−1438 b in both radius and mass. Due to its proximity to its host star, Kepler-277b is quite hot with an equilibrium temperature of about 924 K (651 °C; 1,204 °F), hot enough to melt certain metals.

==== Internal structure and composition ====
Models of Kepler-277b's internal structure suggest that it has a very large iron core with an estimated radius of 2.435 R_{🜨}. The core predominantly consists of an allotrope of iron with a face-centered cubic (FCC) crystalline structure. At the innermost region of Kepler-277b's core where pressures reach as high as 37.52 terapascals, iron exists in a body-centered-tetragonal (BCT) and body-centered cubic (BCC) crystalline structure.

Kepler-277b has a relatively thin silicate mantle in comparison to its core. The mantle of Kepler-277b is thought be predominantly composed of ultrahigh-pressure phases of magnesium silicates (MgSiO_{3}). The uppermost mantle of Kepler-277b is thought to consist of olivine, wadsleyite, and ringwoodite while the lower part of Kepler-277b's upper mantle consists of silicate perovskite and post-perovskite.

=== Orbit ===
Kepler-277b orbits close to its host star, with one orbit lasting 17.324 days. Its semi-major axis, or average distance from the parent object, is about 0.136 AU. For comparison, the planet Mercury in the Solar System takes 88 days to orbit at a distance of 0.38 AU. At this distance, Kepler-277b is very hot and most likely tidally locked to its host star. It is close to a 2:1 resonance with Kepler-277c, which orbits at an average distance of about 0.209 AU.

=== Host star ===
The parent star Kepler-277 is a large yellow star. It is 1.69 R_{☉} and 1.12 M_{☉}, with a temperature of 5946 K, a metallicity of -0.315 [Fe/H], and an unknown age. For comparison, the Sun has a temperature of 5778 K, a metallicity of 0.00 [Fe/H], and an age of about 4.5 billion years. The large radius in comparison to its mass and temperature suggest that Kepler-277 could be a Subgiant star.

== See also ==
- Mega-Earth
- Kepler-277c
