= Kraft break =

In astronomy, the Kraft break refers to the abrupt decrease in stars' average rotation rates at surface temperatures below about 6,500 Kelvin. This temperature corresponds to mid-F type stars. This feature bears the name of astronomer Robert Kraft, though its existence was recognized prior to his publications on the topic.

The break is understood to arise from the presence of a magnetic dynamo in cooler stars, which generates a magnetic field that transfers the star's rotational angular momentum to the stellar wind, thus slowing down stellar rotation through magnetic braking. A convective envelope thick enough for convection timescales to exceed rotation period is required to sustain this solar-type dynamo. Hotter stars, lacking deep convective envelopes, are unable to sustain the dynamo, and so magnetic braking is much less efficient. As a result, they continue to rotate quickly.

The Kraft break coincides with a transition in hot Jupiters' spin-orbit alignment. Hot Jupiters orbiting cooler stars tend to orbit in the same plane as stellar rotation, while those orbiting hotter stars are more likely to be misaligned.
