= HD 103774 =

Star in the constellation Corvus

Observation data Epoch J2000.0 Equinox ICRS
- Constellation: Corvus
- Right ascension: 11^{h} 56^{m} 55.58969^{s}
- Declination: −12° 6′ 28.4731″
- Apparent magnitude (V): 7.13

Characteristics
- Evolutionary stage: main sequence
- Spectral type: F6 V
- B−V color index: 0.503±0.014

Astrometry
Radial velocity (R_{v})	−2.93±0.12 km/s
Proper motion (μ)	RA: −125.077 mas/yr Dec.: −19.950 mas/yr
Parallax (π)	17.7988±0.0273 mas
Distance	183.2 ± 0.3 ly (56.18 ± 0.09 pc)
Absolute magnitude (M_{V})	3.41

Details
Mass	1.38±0.01 M_{☉}
Radius	1.56±0.03 R_{☉}
Luminosity	3.7±0.1 L_{☉}
Surface gravity (log g)	4.183±0.002 cgs
Temperature	6,391±27 K
Metallicity [Fe/H]	0.29 dex
Rotational velocity (v sin i)	7.95 km/s
Age	2.0±0.1 Gyr; 1.05±0.64 Gyr; 0.26 Gyr

Other designations
- BD−11°3211, HD 103774, HIP 58263, SAO 157002, PPM 225148

Database references
SIMBAD	data
Exoplanet Archive	data

HD 103774 is a star with a close orbiting planetary companion in the southern constellation of Corvus. With an apparent visual magnitude of 7.13, it is too faint to be readily visible to the naked eye. Parallax measurements provide a distance estimate of 183 light years from the Sun. It is drifting closer with a radial velocity of −3 km/s. The star has an absolute magnitude of 3.41.

The stellar classification of HD 103774 is F6 V, indicating this is an F-type main-sequence star that is generating energy through core hydrogen fusion. It is a young star with age estimates ranging from 260 million up to 2 billion years of age. The star is mildly active and is spinning with a projected rotational velocity of 8 km/s. It has 1.4 times the mass and 1.56 times the radius of the Sun. The star is radiating 3.7 times the luminosity of the Sun from its photosphere at an effective temperature of 6,391 K.

== Planetary system ==
This star has been under observation as part of a survey using the HARPS spectrogram for a period of 7.5 years. In 2012, the detection of an exoplanetary companion using the radial velocity method was announced. This result was published in January 2013. The object is orbiting close to the host star at a distance of 0.07 AU (10 Gm) with a period of just 5.9 days and an eccentricity (ovalness) of 0.09. As the inclination of the orbital plane is unknown, only a lower limit on the mass can be determined; this lower bound is about equal to the mass of Saturn.

There is marginal evidence for an infrared excess at a wavelength of 12 μm, indicating the likely grain size. More measurements are needed to confirm this signal.

The HD 103774 planetary system
Companion (in order from star)	Mass	Semimajor axis (AU)	Orbital period (days)	Eccentricity	Inclination (°)	Radius
b	>0.367 ± 0.022 M_{J}	0.07 ± 0.001	5.8881 ± 0.0005	0.09 ± 0.04	—	—
