= Gliese 221 =

Star in the constellation Orion

Observation data Epoch J2000.0 Equinox J2000.0
- Constellation: Orion
- Right ascension: 05^{h} 53^{m} 00.285^{s}
- Declination: −05° 59′ 41.44″
- Apparent magnitude (V): 9.70

Characteristics
- Evolutionary stage: main sequence
- Spectral type: K7V/M0V
- B−V color index: 1.321±0.001

Astrometry
Radial velocity (R_{v})	+22.9±0.4 km/s
Proper motion (μ)	RA: −1.170 mas/yr Dec.: −346.762 mas/yr
Parallax (π)	49.2485±0.0185 mas
Distance	66.23 ± 0.02 ly (20.305 ± 0.008 pc)
Absolute magnitude (M_{V})	8.154±0.077

Details
Mass	0.72±0.21 M_{☉}
Radius	0.613±0.064 R_{☉}
Luminosity	0.095±0.01 L_{☉}
Surface gravity (log g)	4.74±0.02 cgs
Temperature	4,324±100 K
Metallicity [Fe/H]	−0.34±0.08 dex
Age	4.4±4 Gyr

Other designations
- BD−06 1339, GJ 221, HIP 27803, PPM 188554, LTT 2396, 2MASS J05530028-0559410, Gaia DR3 3022099969137163904

Database references
SIMBAD	data
Exoplanet Archive	data

Gliese 221 (GJ 221), also known as BD-06 1339, is a star with an exoplanetary companion in the equatorial constellation of Orion. It is too faint to be visible to the naked eye, having an apparent visual magnitude of 9.70 and an absolute magnitude of 8.15. Using parallax measurements, the distance to this system can be estimated as 66.2 light-years. It is receding from the Sun with a radial velocity of +23 km/s. This is a high proper motion star, traversing the celestial sphere at an angular rate of 0.333″·yr^{−1}.

This is a late K-type or early M-type main-sequence star with a stellar classification of K7V/M0V. It has 72% of the mass and 61% of the radius of the Sun. The star is roughly 4.4 billion years old and is depleted in heavy elements, containing just 46% of solar abundance of iron. It is an active star and the level of chromospheric activity has been found to vary significantly over time. The star is radiating 10% of the luminosity of the Sun from its photosphere at an effective temperature of 4,324 K.

== Planetary system ==
From 2003 to 2012, the star was under observance from the High Accuracy Radial Velocity Planet Searcher (HARPS). It is becoming less active and this reduced activity allowed for lower-mass planetary measurements to be made.

A super-Venus planet, and an eccentric Neptune / Saturn in the habitable zone, were deduced by radial velocity in January 2013. They were confirmed in May 2013. In January 2014, a candidate planet d was proposed.

The planet Gliese 221b (BD-06 1339 b) is not transiting the disk of the parent star, and its existence was disputed in 2022.

The Gliese 221 planetary system
Companion (in order from star)	Mass	Semimajor axis (AU)	Orbital period (days)	Eccentricity	Inclination	Radius
b (disputed)	>8.5806 ± 1.2712 M_{🜨}	0.0428 ± 0.0007	3.8728 ± 0.0004	—	—	—
c	>54.026 ± 9.534 M_{🜨}	0.435 ± 0.007	125.94 ± 0.44	0.31 ± 0.11	—	—
d (unconfirmed)	22.246 M_{🜨}	1.0947	500	—	—	—
