= Kepler-89e =

Exoplanet

Discovery
- Discovered by: Lauren M. Weiss et al.
- Discovery date: 9 March 2013
- Detection method: Transit method

Orbital characteristics
- Semi-major axis: 0.3046 ± 0.0040 AU (45,570,000 ± 600,000 km)
- Eccentricity: 0.019 ± 0.23
- Orbital period (sidereal): 54.32031 ± 0.00012 d
- Inclination: 89.76 ± 0.15
- Semi-amplitude: 4.5+2.3 −3.5
- Star: Kepler-89

Physical characteristics
- Mean radius: 6.56 ± 0.62 R_{🜨}
- Mass: 35+18 −28 M_{🜨}
- Mean density: 0.60+0.26 −0.56 g cm^{−3}
- Temperature: 584 K (311 °C; 592 °F)

Kepler-89e, also known as KOI-94e, is an exoplanet in the constellation of Cygnus. It orbits Kepler-89.

== Physical properties ==
It is classed as a type III planet, making it cloudless and blue, and giving it the appearance of a larger version of Uranus and Neptune. It has a mass around 35 times that of Earth. It has a similar density to Saturn, 0.60 g/cm^{3}, giving it a radius 6.56 times that of the Earth. It orbits an F-type main-sequence star at a distance of 0.305 astronomical units (au), with a period of 54.32031 days, making its orbit smaller than that of Mercury's. It has a very low eccentricity of 0.019. It has a temperature of 584 K.

== Host star ==
Kepler-89e orbits the star Kepler-89. Kepler-89 has a mass of 1.18 solar masses, and a radius of 1.32 solar radii. It is 3.3 billion years old, younger than the Sun, making its planets about 3,000,000,000 years old (3 Gyr). It has a temperature of 6,210 K, making it appear bright yellowish-white.
