= Kepler-277c =

Large rocky exoplanet

Discovery
- Discovery site: Kepler Space Observatory
- Discovery date: 2014
- Detection method: Transit

Orbital characteristics
- Semi-major axis: ~0.209 AU
- Eccentricity: null
- Orbital period (sidereal): 33.006 d
- Inclination: null
- Star: Kepler-277

Physical characteristics
- Mean radius: 3.36 ^{+0.83}_{−0.72} R_{🜨}
- Mass: 64.2 ^{+18.1}_{−15.7} M_{🜨}
- Mean density: 9.33+15.33 −5.69 g cm^{−3}
- Surface gravity: 5.69+6.12 −2.93 g
- Temperature: 745 K (472 °C; 881 °F)

Kepler-277c (also known by its Kepler Objects of Interest designation KOI-1215.02) is the third most massive and second-largest rocky planet ever discovered, with a mass about 64 times that of Earth. Discovered in 2014 by the Kepler Space Telescope, Kepler-277c is a Neptune-sized exoplanet with a very high mass and density for an object of its radius, suggesting a composition made mainly of rock with some amounts of water. Along with its sister planet, Kepler-277b, the planet's mass was determined using transit-timing variations (TTVs).

== Characteristics ==
=== Size and temperature ===
Kepler-277c was detected using the transit method and TTVs, allowing for both its mass and radius to be determined to some level. It is approximately 3.36 R_{🜨}, close to the size of Neptune. At that radius, most planets should be gaseous Mini-Neptunes with no solid surface. However, the mass of Kepler-277c is extremely high for its size. Transit-timing variations indicate a planetary mass of about 64.2 M_{🜨}, close to Saturn's mass at 95.16 M_{🜨}. The planet has a density of approximately 9.33 g/cm^{3} and about 5.7 times the surface gravity of Earth. Such a high density for an object of this size implies that, like its sister planet, Kepler-277c is an enormous rock-based planet with a small portion of its mass as water. It is currently the third most massive and second largest terrestrial planet ever discovered, behind Kepler-277b in mass and PSR J1719-1438 b in both radius and mass. Due to its proximity to its host star, Kepler-277c is quite hot with an equilibrium temperature of about 745 K (472 °C; 881 °F), hot enough to melt certain metals.

=== Orbit ===
Kepler-277c orbits close to its host star, with one orbit lasting 33.006 days. Its semi-major axis, or average distance from the parent object, is about 0.209 AU. For comparison, the planet Mercury takes 88 days to orbit the Sun at a distance of 0.38 AU. At this distance, Kepler-277c is very hot and most likely tidally locked to its host star. It is close to a 1:2 resonance with Kepler-277b, which orbits at an average distance of about 0.136 AU.

=== Host star ===
The parent star Kepler-277 is a large yellow star. It is 1.69 R_{☉} and 1.12 M_{☉}, with a temperature of 5946 K, a metallicity of -0.315 [Fe/H], and an unknown age. For comparison, the Sun has a temperature of 5778 K, a metallicity of 0.00 [Fe/H], and an age of about 4.5 billion years. The large radius in comparison to its mass and temperature suggest that Kepler-277 could be a Subgiant star.

== See also ==
- Mega-Earth
- Kepler-277b
