= HD 113337 =

Binary star system in the constellation Draco

Observation data Epoch J2000 Equinox ICRS
- Constellation: Draco
- Right ascension: 13^{h} 01^{m} 46.9269^{s}
- Declination: 63° 36′ 36.796″
- Apparent magnitude (V): 6.03

Characteristics
- Spectral type: F6V+M3.5V+M3.5V

Astrometry

A
Radial velocity (R_{v})	−14.93±0.13 km/s
Proper motion (μ)	RA: −173.342±0.035 mas/yr Dec.: 24.850±0.027 mas/yr
Parallax (π)	27.6253±0.0253 mas
Distance	118.1 ± 0.1 ly (36.20 ± 0.03 pc)
Absolute magnitude (M_{V})	+3.18

Orbit
Primary	HD 113337
Secondary	LSPM J1301+6337
Semi-major axis (a)	119″ (4310 AU)″

Details

HD 113337
Mass	1.48±0.08 M_{☉}
Radius	1.50±0.04 R_{☉}
Luminosity	4.29±0.25 L_{☉}
Surface gravity (log g)	4.21±0.08 cgs
Temperature	6774±125 K
Metallicity	0.07±0.02
Rotational velocity (v sin i)	1.82±0.07 km/s
Age	15^{+6}_{−1} Myr

LSPM J1301+6337
Mass	0.245*2 M_{☉}

Other designations
- BD+64 927, HD 113337, HIP 63584, HR 4934, TYC 4166-541-1, 2MASS J13014695+6336368, Gaia DR2 1676282377934772608

Database references
SIMBAD	data

HD 113337 (LDS 2662 A) is the primary component of binary star system LDS 2662, about 118 light-years away from Earth. The primary main-sequence star belongs to the spectral class of F6. The star system is extremely young, and it is slightly enriched in heavy elements, with an abundance of such elements at about 115% that of the Sun.

The primary star is surrounded by a debris disk discovered by the Herschel Space Observatory, and the plane of the disk is likely misaligned with the planetary orbits by 17–32°. The effective temperature of this disk is 55 K.

The possibility of other stellar companions near the primary star was ruled out in 2016, for projected separations above 5″ (181 AU).

The existence of a secondary companion (called LDS 2662 B, or LSPM J1301+6337) was discovered in 2001 and confirmed to be bound to the primary in 2007. Initially believed to be a single red dwarf star, in 2012 the companion was discovered to actually be a pair of nearly identical red dwarfs, of spectral class M3.5, orbiting each other at a distance of 7.2±2.6 AU, with a period of 39 years.

== Planetary system ==
In 2013, one superjovian planet, HD 113337 b, was discovered, via the radial velocity method, on an eccentric orbit around HD 113337. Another giant planet or brown dwarf candidate, HD 113337 c, has been suspected since 2018, with the evidence for its existence strengthened in 2019, and confirmed via astrometry in 2020. The 2020 study estimates an inclination of 31° for the outer planet, while a 2022 study estimates an inclination of 57.5°.

The HD 113337 planetary system
Companion (in order from star)	Mass	Semimajor axis (AU)	Orbital period (days)	Eccentricity	Inclination (°)	Radius
b	≥3.259+0.377 −0.409 M_{J}	1.022+0.055 −0.062	317.6+1.6 −1.4	0.280+0.036 −0.041	—	—
c	19.821+2.430 −2.575 M_{J}	6.805+0.536 −0.468	5429.9+450.3 −286.0	0.164+0.057 −0.056	57.478+4.552 −3.652	—
