= Stephen R. Kane =

Stephen Kane
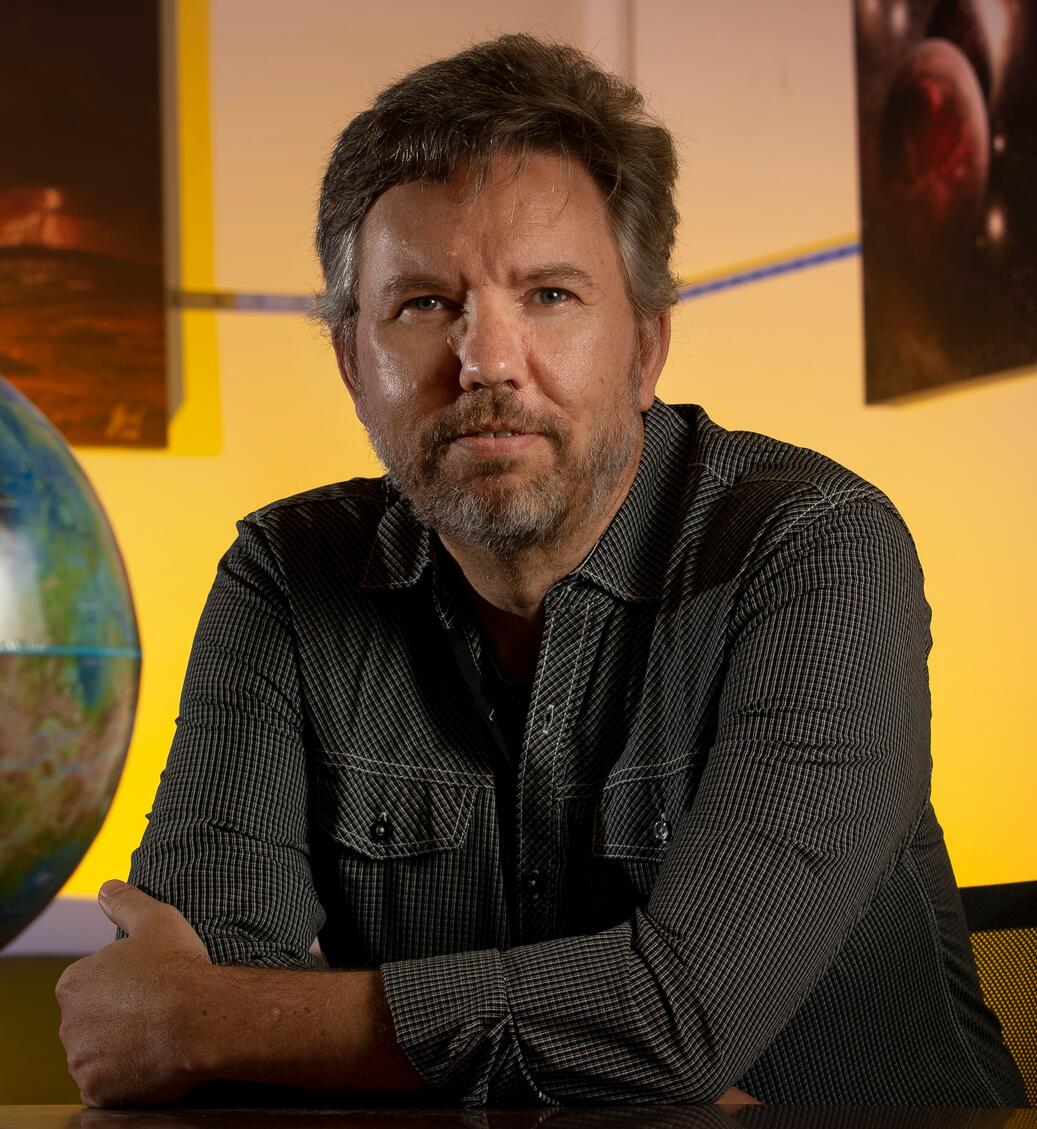
- Stephen Kane at the University of California, Riverside, 2024.
- Born: October 25, 1973 (age 52)
- Occupation: Planetary Astrophysicist

Stephen Kane (born October 25, 1973) is an Australian-American astrophysicist, professor of planetary astrophysics at the University of California, Riverside, and a Fellow of the American Astronomical Society. His research focuses on exoplanet detection and characterization, orbital dynamics, planetary habitability, and comparative planetology, including the study of Venus as an analogue for terrestrial exoplanets. Kane and Dawn Gelino created the Habitable Zone Gallery, an exoplanet resource hosted by IPAC that visualizes planetary orbits relative to their stars' habitable zones. He is a science team member for NASA's DAVINCI mission to Venus. The minor planet (711599) Kane is named in his honor.

== Education ==
Kane graduated from Macquarie University with a Bachelors of Science in Physics in 1994. In 1995 Kane received First Class with Honors at the same institution for his work studying a galactic extended source, which he identified as a previously unknown supernova remnant. In 2000 Kane received his Ph.D. from the University of Tasmania with a thesis focusing on gravitational microlensing, the bending of space by gravity which has a variety of astrophysics applications, including the discovery of exoplanets.

== Career ==
During his graduate degree, Kane had the title of research assistant at the Space Telescope Science Institute in 1996. After graduating, Kane joined the University of St. Andrews in 2001 as a postdoctoral research fellow, he collaborated with a team of scientists that discovered the coldest, smallest known exoplanet (OGLE-2005-BLG-390Lb), confirming the hopes that observation of habitable planets was within the reach of technology[7]. Kane and the entire SuperWASP (Super Wide Angle Search for Planets) team was later awarded the Royal Astronomical Society's Group Achievement Award in 2010 for their discovery of 18 exoplanets. In 2005 he returned to the United States to work as a postdoctoral associate at the University of Florida where he discovered some of the hottest known exoplanets of the time. In 2008 Kane became a research scientist at the NASA Exoplanet Science Institute (NExScI) at the California Institute of Technology (Caltech) where he focused his research on exoplanet habitability, the study of properties and conditions favorable to life. While at Caltech he and collaborator Dawn Gelino created the Habitable Zone Gallery, a website dedicated to providing information on exoplanets for both scientists and the general public. Kane joined San Francisco State University in 2013 and was promoted to Associate Professor in 2016. In August 2016, Kane and collaborators released the "Catalog of Kepler Habitable Zone Exoplanet Candidates", identifying numerous Habitable Zone planets discovered by the Kepler mission. In 2017, Kane moved his research team to the University of California, Riverside where he joined their astrobiology initiative, funded by the NASA Astrobiology Institute.

== Research ==
Kane's research spans exoplanet detection, orbital dynamics, planetary habitability, and the comparative study of terrestrial planets. While at the NASA Exoplanet Science Institute, Kane and Dawn Gelino created the Habitable Zone Gallery, a resource for comparing the orbits of known exoplanets with the habitable zones of their host stars. A related paper described the service as providing habitable-zone information, planetary effective temperatures, and orbital visualizations for known exoplanetary systems.

In 2016, Kane was lead author of a catalog of Kepler habitable-zone exoplanet candidates, produced as part of the Kepler Habitable Zone Working Group.

Kane has also contributed to the study of Venus as a guide for interpreting terrestrial exoplanets. In 2014, Kane, Ravi Kumar Kopparapu, and Shawn Domagal-Goldman defined the "Venus Zone", the region around a star in which a terrestrial planet is more likely to resemble Venus than Earth because of atmospheric erosion or runaway greenhouse limits. Later work led by Kane described Venus as a laboratory for exoplanetary science, and a 2024 Nature Astronomy Perspective by Kane and Paul K. Byrne argued that Venus provides an anchor point for understanding planetary habitability and the divergent evolution of rocky worlds.

== Public outreach and media ==
Kane has discussed exoplanet habitability and Venus science in public-facing interviews, science communication, and mission-advocacy contexts. In 2024, he participated in meetings on Capitol Hill advocating for continued support of NASA Venus missions. His Venus and exoplanet habitability research has also been discussed in public science coverage associated with his 2024 Nature Astronomy Perspective.

== Honors and recognition ==
Kane was part of the SuperWASP team that received the Royal Astronomical Society Group Achievement Award in 2010 for the team's contributions to exoplanet discovery.

In 2025, Kane was elected a Fellow of the American Astronomical Society. The AAS cited his contributions to planetary habitability, exoplanet detection, insights into Venus, and his role in fostering collaborations between astrophysicists and planetary scientists.

The minor planet (711599) Kane, provisional designation 2014 PV19, was named in his honor. The naming citation was published by the International Astronomical Union's Working Group Small Body Nomenclature in WGSBN Bulletin 6, number 1.
