= Kepler-68c =

Earth-sized exoplanet

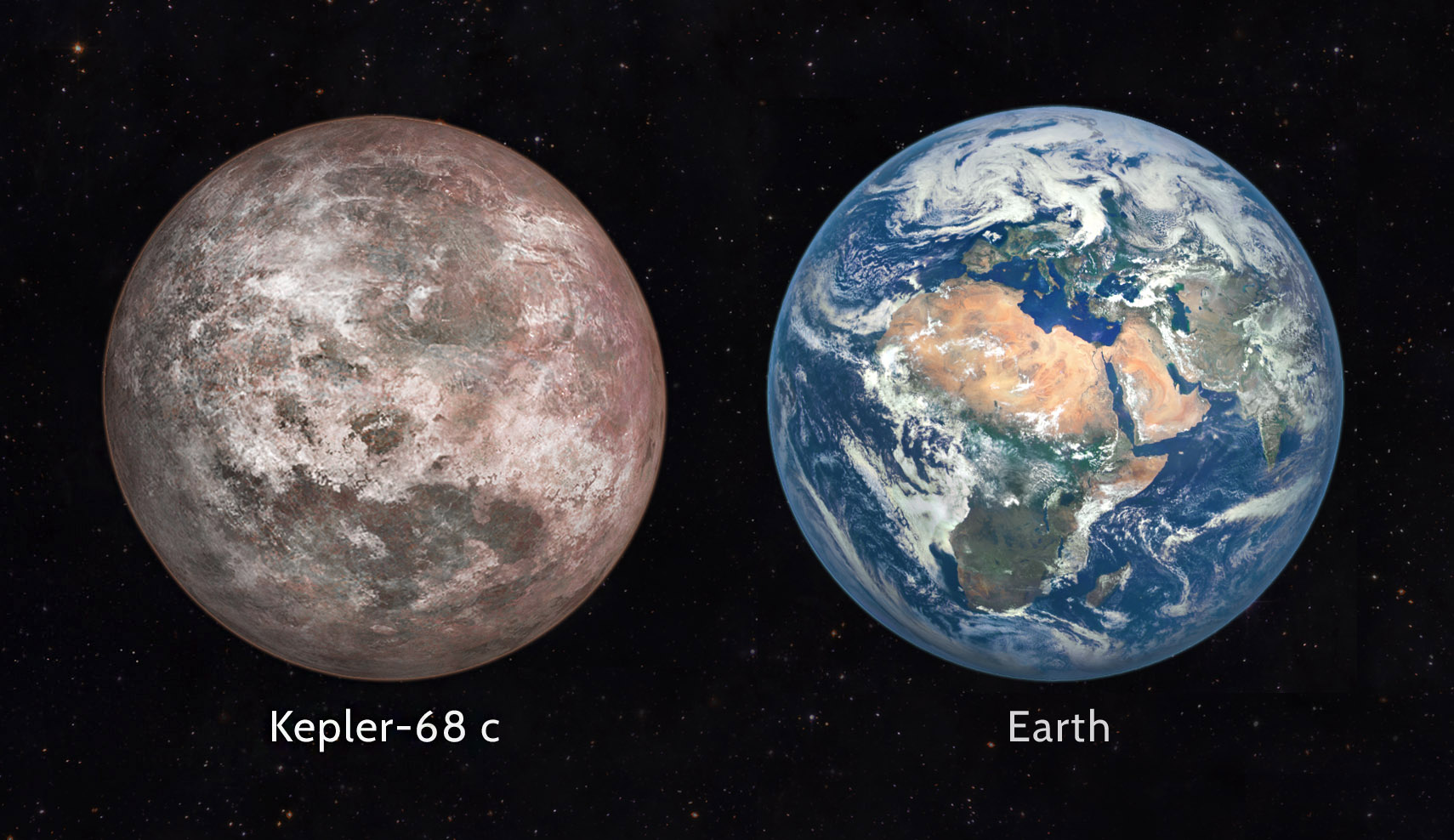
- Artist's impression of Kepler-68 c and size comparison with Earth

Discovery
- Discovered by: Gilliland et al.
- Discovery site: Kepler Space Observatory
- Discovery date: 2013
- Detection method: Transits, and transit-timing variations

Designations
- Alternative names: KOI-246.01

Orbital characteristics
- Semi-major axis: 0.09059±0.00082 AU
- Orbital period (sidereal): 9.605085±0.000072 d
- Inclination: 86.93±0.41 º
- Semi-amplitude: 0.59+0.50 −0.52 m/s
- Star: Kepler-68

Physical characteristics
- Mean radius: 0.953+0.037 −0.042 R_{🜨}
- Mass: 2.02+1.72 −1.78 M_{🜨}

Kepler-68c is an Earth-sized planet orbiting the star Kepler-68 in the constellation of Cygnus. It was discovered by planetary-transit methods by the Kepler space telescope in February 2013. It has a mass of 4.8^{+2.5}_{−3.6} times that of Earth (0.015 M_{J}) and a radius of 0.953^{+0.037}_{−0.042} Earth radii. It has an orbital period of 9.605085 days at a distance of about 0.09059 AU from its star. Relatively wide constraints on Kepler-68c's mass are the result lack of detection of the planet through radial-velocity and transit-timing-variation methods.

== See also ==
- List of planets discovered by the Kepler spacecraft
