= Kepler-68b =

Super-Earth or mini-Neptune

Discovery
- Discovered by: Gilliland et al.
- Discovery site: Kepler Space Observatory
- Discovery date: 2013
- Detection method: Transits, and transit-timing variations

Designations
- Alternative names: KOI-246.01

Orbital characteristics
- Semi-major axis: 0.06170±0.00056 AU
- Orbital period (sidereal): 5.398763 d
- Inclination: 87.60±0.90 º
- Semi-amplitude: 2.7+0.48 −0.46 m/s
- Star: Kepler-68

Physical characteristics
- Mean radius: 2.31+0.06 −0.09 R_{🜨}
- Mass: 7.65+1.37 −1.32 M_{🜨}

Kepler-68b is an exoplanet orbiting the Sun-like star Kepler-68 in the constellation of Cygnus. Discovered by planetary-transit methods by the Kepler space telescope in February 2013, it has a radius of 2.31 ± 0.07 that of Earth and a density of 2.46–4.3 g/cm^{3}. It has an orbital period of 5.398763 days at a distance of about 0.0617 AU from its star. Doppler measurements were made to determine its mass to be 5.79 times that of Earth (0.026 M_{J}).

With a density of 2.6 g/cm^{3} it has physical characteristics of both a super-Earth and a mini-Neptune.

== See also ==
- List of planets discovered by the Kepler spacecraft
