= Magnetic braking (astronomy) =

Theory to explain slowing of a star's spin

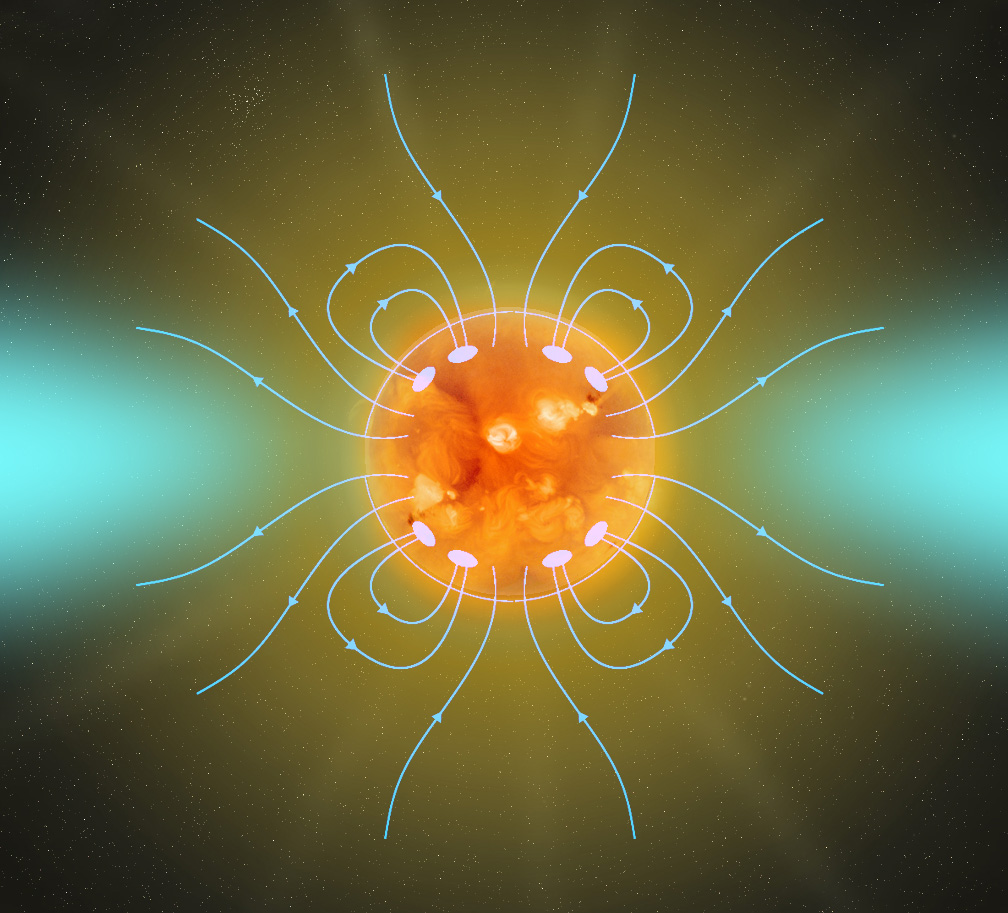
The magnetic field lines rotate together with the Sun as a solid object. Ionized material carried along the field lines will at some point $r_c$ escape the magnetic field lines and thus take away the Sun's angular momentum.

Magnetic braking is the process by which a star loses angular momentum due to a coupling between its solar wind and magnetic field. Magnetic braking plays an important role in the formation and evolution of stars, particularly binaries.

== Stellar formation ==
Magnetic braking is integral to explaining angular momentum loss during stellar formation. Consider some fragment of a star-forming molecular cloud with angular momentum derived from the observed galactic turbulence. Current theories of star formation state that such a cloud should flatten and contract, conserving angular momentum $L$ in the process. As the cloud contracts and its density increases, the angular velocity must increase, causing the cloud to spin faster. Without considering magnetic braking, an angular momentum problem emerges where the large angular momentum of the cloud causes very high centrifugal forces limiting star formation. In such a scenario the observed cloud angular momentum would be orders of magnitude larger than observed in young stars.

This angular momentum problem is resolved, however, when considering the effects of magnetic braking. In a protostellar cloud, both gravitational and magnetic effects are significant, and magnetic braking acts as a torque, transporting angular momentum from the infalling material to the interstellar medium, slowing down a young star's rotation and reducing centrifugal forces.

== Definition ==
Magnetic braking occurs as a result of ionized material captured by the stellar magnetic field. As material escapes from a star via the stellar wind, highly ionized material will be captured by the field lines and begin rotating along them. When some footpoint motion along a field line is then induced at its base, causing torsional or transverse oscillation, the magnetic tension in the field line then leads to Alfvén waves transversely outwards from the magnetic field. These torsional disturbances in the magnetic field then lead to the exertion of some torque beyond the stellar radius by the ionized stellar wind, decreasing the star's angular velocity. The critical radius of this torque, the Alfvén radius (or Alfvén surface), is the point where the ionized stellar wind stops rotating with the star, or where the magnetic energy density exceeds the kinetic energy density carried by the wind. The same effect is used in the slowing down of a figure skater as they extend their arms, where their arms act as a lever arm to decrease their speed. Here, however, the angular momentum loss comes from the decoupling of the stellar wind and magnetic field rather than frictional forces or air resistance.

== Theory ==
As ionized material follows the Sun's magnetic field lines, due to the effect of magnetic field lines being frozen in the plasma, the charged particles feel a force $\mathbf{F}$ of the magnitude:

$$\mathbf{F}=q \mathbf{v} \times \mathbf{B}$$

where $q$ is the charge, $\mathbf{v}$ is the velocity and $\mathbf{B}$ is the magnetic field vector. This bending action forces the particles to "corkscrew" around the magnetic field lines while held in place by a magnetic pressure or energy density $P_B$, while rotating together with the Sun as a solid body:

$$P_B=\frac{B^2}{2 \mu_0}$$

Since magnetic field strength decreases with the cube of the distance there will be a distance from the star where the kinetic gas pressure $P_g$ of the ionized gas is great enough to break away from the field lines:

$$P_g=n m v^2$$

where $n$ is the number of particles, $m$ is the mass of the individual particle and $v$ is the radial velocity away from the Sun, or the speed of the solar wind.

Due to the high conductivity of the stellar wind, the magnetic field outside the sun declines with radius like the mass density of the wind, i.e. as an inverse square law. The magnetic field is therefore given by

$$B(r)=B_s \frac{R^2}{r^2}$$

where $B_s$ is the magnetic field on the surface of the Sun and $R$ is its radius. The critical distance where the material will break away from the field lines can then be calculated as the distance where the kinetic pressure and the magnetic pressure are equal, i.e.
$$P_{B}=P_{g} \implies  \frac{B(r_c)^2}{2\mu_0}=\frac{B_{s}^2R^4}{2\mu_{0}r^4_{c}}=nmv^2$$
If the solar mass loss is isotropic then the mass loss becomes $n m= \frac{dM/dt}{4\pi r^2 v}$; plugging this into the above equation and isolating the critical radius it follows that the Alfvén radius is given by

$$r_c=R \left(\frac{2\pi B_s^2 R^2}{\mu_0 v \dot{M}}\right)^{1 \over 2}$$

=== Current solar value ===
It is estimated that:

- The mass loss rate of the Sun due to its stellar wind is about $\dot{M_{\odot}}=dM_{\odot}/dt = 2\cdot 10^{-14} M_{\odot}/\text{yr} \approx 1.2 \cdot 10^9 \, \rm kg/s$
- The solar wind speed is $v=5\cdot10^5 \, \rm m/s$
- The magnetic field on the surface is $B_s \approx 10^{-4} \rm T$
- The solar radius is $R = 7 \cdot 10^5 \, \rm km$

This leads to a critical radius $r_c =15 R_\odot$. This means that the ionized plasma will rotate together with the Sun as a solid body until it reaches a distance of nearly 15 times the radius of the Sun; from there the material will break off and stop affecting the Sun.

The amount of solar mass needed to be thrown out along the field lines to make the Sun completely stop rotating can then be calculated using the specific angular momentum:

$$\frac{j_\odot}{j_c}=\left(\frac{R_\odot}{r_c}\right)^2 \approx 0.5\%$$

It has been suggested that the Sun lost a comparable amount of material over the course of its lifetime.

== Weakened magnetic braking ==
In 2016 scientists at Carnegie Observatories published a research suggesting that stars at a similar stage of life as the Sun were spinning faster than magnetic braking theories predicted. To calculate this they pinpointed the dark spots on the surface of stars and tracked them as they moved with the stars' spin. While this method has been successful for measuring the spin of younger stars, the "weakened" magnetic braking in older stars proved harder to confirm, as the latter notoriously have fewer star spots. In a study published in Nature Astronomy in 2021, researchers at the University of Birmingham used a different approach, namely asteroseismology, to confirm that older stars do appear to rotate faster than expected. They attribute this weakened magnetic braking to the spindown of the star decreasing the Alfvén radius and reducing the magnetic braking torque.

== See also ==
- Alfvén wave
- Kraft break
- Star formation
- Stellar magnetic field
- Stellar rotation
