= Kepler-67 =

G-type star in the constellation Cygnus

Observation data Epoch J2000 Equinox ICRS
- Constellation: Cygnus
- Right ascension: 19^{h} 36^{m} 36.8094^{s}
- Declination: +46° 09′ 59.167″
- Apparent magnitude (V): 16.4

Characteristics
- Evolutionary stage: main sequence
- Spectral type: G9V

Astrometry
Proper motion (μ)	RA: −3.530(41) mas/yr Dec.: −8.741(39) mas/yr
Parallax (π)	0.8734±0.0344 mas
Distance	3,700 ± 100 ly (1,140 ± 50 pc)

Details
Mass	0.865±0.034 M_{☉}
Radius	0.778±0.031 R_{☉}
Surface gravity (log g)	4.594±0.022 cgs
Temperature	5,331±63 K
Metallicity [Fe/H]	0.012±0.003 dex
Rotation	10.464±0.014 days
Age	1±0.17 Gyr

Other designations
- KOI-2115

Database references
SIMBAD	data

Kepler-67 is a star in the open cluster NGC 6811 in the constellation Cygnus. It has slightly less mass than the Sun and has one confirmed planet, slightly smaller than Neptune, announced in 2013.

== Planetary system ==
The Kepler-67 planetary system
Companion (in order from star)	Mass	Semimajor axis (AU)	Orbital period (days)	Eccentricity	Inclination (°)	Radius
b	0.31±0.06 M_{J}	0.1171±0.0015	15.7259±0.00011	—	—	0.26±0.014 R_{J}
