= List of stars in Lyra =

This is the list of notable stars in the constellation Lyra, sorted by decreasing brightness.

Name	B	F	Var	HD	HIP	RA	Dec	vis. mag.	abs. mag.	Dist. (ly)	Sp. class	Notes
Vega	α	3		172167	91262	18^{h} 36^{m} 56.19^{s}	+38° 46′ 58.8″	0.03	0.58	25	A0Vnvar	Wega, Fidis, Harp Star, Al Nesr al Waki, Vulture Cadens; 5th brightest star, has a dust disk; δ Sct variable, V_{max} = -0.02^{m}, V_{min} = 0.07^{m}, P = 0.19 d
γ Lyr	γ	14		176437	93194	18^{h} 58^{m} 56.62^{s}	+32° 41′ 22.4″	3.25	−3.20	634	B9III	Sulafat, Sulaphat; suspected variable, V_{max} = 3.23^{m}, V_{min} = 3.26^{m}
β Lyr	β	10		174638	92420	18^{h} 50^{m} 04.79^{s}	+33° 21′ 45.6″	3.52	−3.64	881	B8II-III(n)+O9.5Vn	Sheliak, Shelyak, Shiliak; prototype β Lyr variable, V_{max} = 3.30^{m}, V_{min} = 4.35^{m}, P = 12.94061713 d
R Lyr	π	13	R	175865	92862	18^{h} 55^{m} 20.09^{s}	+43° 56′ 45.2″	4.08	−1.07	349	M5IIIvar	Niandao, semiregular variable, V_{max} = 3.81^{m}, V_{min} = 4.44^{m}, P = 46 d
δ^{2} Lyr	δ^{2}	12		175588	92791	18^{h} 54^{m} 30.29^{s}	+36° 53′ 55.0″	4.22	−2.98	898	M4IIvar	Jiantai, semiregular variable, V_{max} = 4.22^{m}, V_{min} = 4.33^{m}
κ Lyr	κ	1		168775	89826	18^{h} 19^{m} 51.72^{s}	+36° 03′ 52.0″	4.33	0.02	238	K2IIIvar	suspected variable, V_{max} = 4.31^{m}, V_{min} = 4.35^{m}
ζ^{1} Lyr	ζ^{1}	6		173648	91971	18^{h} 44^{m} 46.34^{s}	+37° 36′ 18.2″	4.34	0.97	154	Am	Kautoki, variable star, ΔV = 0.003^{m}, P = 1.53243 d
θ Lyr	θ	21		180809	94713	19^{h} 16^{m} 22.10^{s}	+38° 08′ 01.4″	4.35	−2.51	769	K0II	Ninnisig, suspected variable, V_{max} = 4.32^{m}, V_{min} = 4.37^{m}
η Lyr	η	20		180163	94481	19^{h} 13^{m} 45.49^{s}	+39° 08′ 45.5″	4.43	−3.09	1042	B2.5IV	Aladfar; variable star, ΔV = 0.005^{m}, P = 19.73944 d
ε^{2} Lyr A	ε^{2}	5		173607	91926	18^{h} 44^{m} 22.78^{s}	+39° 36′ 45.3″	4.60	1.13	160	A8Vn	component of the ε Lyr system; binary star; suspected variable, ΔV = 0.02^{m}
ε^{1} Lyr A	ε^{1}	4		173582	91919	18^{h} 44^{m} 20.34^{s}	+39° 40′ 11.9″	4.67	1.19	162	F1V	Pongaponga, component of the ε Lyr system; binary star
HD 173780				173780	92088	18^{h} 46^{m} 04.47^{s}	+26° 39′ 43.5″	4.84	0.39	252	K3III	
λ Lyr	λ	15		176670	93279	19^{h} 00^{m} 00.82^{s}	+32° 08′ 43.8″	4.94	−3.43	1538	K3III	suspected variable
16 Lyr		16		177196	93408	19^{h} 01^{m} 26.36^{s}	+46° 56′ 06.1″	5.00	2.04	128	A7V	suspected variable, V_{max} = 5.00^{m}, V_{min} = 5.09^{m}
μ Lyr	μ	2		169702	90191	18^{h} 24^{m} 13.80^{s}	+39° 30′ 26.1″	5.11	−0.55	441	A3IVn	Alathfar, Al Athfar
HD 176051				176051	93017	18^{h} 57^{m} 01.47^{s}	+32° 54′ 05.8″	5.20	4.32	49	G0V	has a planet (b)
17 Lyr		17		178449	93917	19^{h} 07^{m} 25.50^{s}	+32° 30′ 06.0″	5.20	2.16	132	F0V	
ν Lyr	ν, ν^{2}	9		174602	92405	18^{h} 49^{m} 52.92^{s}	+32° 33′ 03.9″	5.22	0.90	238	A3V	
ι Lyr	ι	18		178475	93903	19^{h} 07^{m} 18.13^{s}	+36° 06′ 00.6″	5.25	−1.78	832	B6IV	Be star
HD 176527				176527	93256	18^{h} 59^{m} 45.43^{s}	+26° 13′ 49.6″	5.26	0.12	348	K2III	suspected RS CVn variable
ε^{2} Lyr B	ε^{2}	5		173608		18^{h} 44^{m} 22.90^{s}	+39° 36′ 46.0″	5.37				component of the ε Lyr system
HD 172044				172044	91235	18^{h} 36^{m} 37.35^{s}	+33° 28′ 08.5″	5.41	−0.61	522	B8II-IIIp..	suspected α^{2} CVn variable, V_{max} = 5.40^{m}, V_{min} = 5.45^{m}
HD 175740				175740	92831	18^{h} 54^{m} 52.18^{s}	+41° 36′ 09.8″	5.46	0.89	267	G8III	
HD 171301				171301	90923	18^{h} 32^{m} 49.95^{s}	+30° 33′ 15.1″	5.47	0.22	365	B8IV	
HD 178233				178233	93843	19^{h} 06^{m} 37.68^{s}	+28° 37′ 42.2″	5.53	2.48	133	F0III	
HD 167965				167965	89482	18^{h} 15^{m} 38.78^{s}	+42° 09′ 33.6″	5.56	−0.53	540	B7IV	variable star, ΔV = 0.008^{m}, P = 0.57460 d
δ^{1} Lyr	δ^{1}	11		175426	92728	18^{h} 53^{m} 43.56^{s}	+36° 58′ 18.2″	5.58	−2.02	1079	B2.5V	suspected variable, V_{max} = 5.56^{m}, V_{min} = 5.62^{m}
HD 177808				177808	93718	19^{h} 04^{m} 57.82^{s}	+31° 44′ 39.3″	5.63	−0.72	606	M0III	
HD 175443				175443	92768	18^{h} 54^{m} 13.25^{s}	+27° 54′ 34.9″	5.64	0.17	405	K4III	
HD 173417				173417	91883	18^{h} 43^{m} 51.61^{s}	+31° 55′ 36.9″	5.68	2.10	169	F1III-IV	
HD 176871				176871	93393	19^{h} 01^{m} 17.36^{s}	+26° 17′ 29.2″	5.69	−0.96	697	B5V	
ζ^{2} Lyr	ζ^{2}	7		173649	91973	18^{h} 44^{m} 48.19^{s}	+37° 35′ 40.4″	5.73	2.41	150	F0IVvar	Urquchillay, suspected variable, V_{max} = 5.68^{m}, V_{min} = 5.74^{m}
HD 182694				182694	95352	19^{h} 23^{m} 56.49^{s}	+43° 23′ 17.7″	5.85	0.38	404	G6.5IIIa	
HD 180450				180450	94630	19^{h} 15^{m} 24.84^{s}	+30° 31′ 35.2″	5.88	−2.25	1376	M0III	variable star, ΔV = 0.014^{m}, P = 2.63213 d
V542 Lyr			V542	176318	93104	18^{h} 58^{m} 01.90^{s}	+38° 15′ 58.3″	5.89	−0.11	516	B7IV	Algol variable
ν^{1} Lyr	ν^{1}	8		174585	92398	18^{h} 49^{m} 45.91^{s}	+32° 48′ 46.2″	5.93	−1.52	1009	B3IV	suspected variable, V_{max} = 5.89^{m}, V_{min} = 5.96^{m}
19 Lyr		19	V471	179527	94311	19^{h} 11^{m} 46.01^{s}	+31° 17′ 00.5″	5.93	−1.46	979	B9p Si	α^{2} CVn variable, V_{max} = 5.91^{m}, V_{min} = 5.98^{m}, P = 1.160898 d
HD 175635				175635	92833	18^{h} 54^{m} 52.52^{s}	+33° 58′ 06.9″	5.99	−2.06	1331	G8III+...	
XY Lyr			XY	172380	91373	18^{h} 38^{m} 06.47^{s}	+39° 40′ 05.9″	6.02	−1.81	1199	M4.5II	semiregular variable, V_{max} = 5.6^{m}, V_{min} = 6.6^{m}, P = 120 d
ε^{1} Lyr B	ε^{1}	4		173583		18^{h} 44^{m} 20.30^{s}	+39° 40′ 16.0″	6.02				component of the ε Lyr system
HD 176896				176896	93354	19^{h} 00^{m} 55.20^{s}	+33° 48′ 07.7″	6.04	0.62	396	K0III:	
HD 173416				173416	91852	18^{h} 43^{m} 36.11^{s}	+36° 33′ 23.8″	6.06	0.41	440	G8III	Xihe; has a planet (b)
HD 173936				173936	92098	18^{h} 46^{m} 13.01^{s}	+41° 26′ 30.5″	6.06	−1.81	1221	B6V	
HD 174179				174179	92243	18^{h} 47^{m} 57.37^{s}	+31° 45′ 24.6″	6.06	−1.50	1062	B3IVp	
HD 177809				177809	93720	19^{h} 04^{m} 58.27^{s}	+30° 44′ 00.4″	6.07	−0.72	743	M2III	suspected variable
HD 182272				182272	95235	19^{h} 22^{m} 33.35^{s}	+33° 31′ 05.6″	6.09	1.01	339	K0III	
HD 171780				171780	91119	18^{h} 35^{m} 13.50^{s}	+34° 27′ 28.8″	6.10	−1.42	1038	B5Vn	suspected variable
HD 174959				174959	92551	18^{h} 51^{m} 36.52^{s}	+36° 32′ 20.8″	6.10	−1.58	1120	B6IV	
HD 168322				168322	89604	18^{h} 17^{m} 06.95^{s}	+40° 56′ 11.7″	6.12	0.98	348	G9III	
V473 Lyr			V473	180583	94685	19^{h} 15^{m} 59.49^{s}	+27° 55′ 34.7″	6.18	−2.38	1680	F6Ib-II	classical Cepheid, V_{max} = 5.99^{m}, V_{min} = 6.35^{m}, P = 1.49078 d
V543 Lyr			V543	176502	93177	18^{h} 58^{m} 46.59^{s}	+40° 40′ 45.1″	6.20	−1.12	948	B3V	β Cep variable
HD 179583				179583	94280	19^{h} 11^{m} 23.16^{s}	+40° 25′ 45.0″	6.20	0.40	471	A3V	
V533 Lyr			V533	172187	91250	18^{h} 36^{m} 45.53^{s}	+43° 13′ 18.6″	6.21	0.71	411	F0V	β Lyr variable
HD 174881				174881	92550	18^{h} 51^{m} 35.89^{s}	+28° 47′ 01.2″	6.22	−2.23	1598	K1II-III	
HD 172671				172671	91491	18^{h} 39^{m} 33.03^{s}	+40° 56′ 06.2″	6.25	−0.72	807	B9V	
HD 181470				181470	94932	19^{h} 19^{m} 01.15^{s}	+37° 26′ 43.1″	6.25	−0.29	663	A0III	
HD 175132				175132	92599	18^{h} 52^{m} 07.25^{s}	+41° 22′ 59.7″	6.28	−1.59	1221	B9p Si	variable star, ΔV = 0.009^{m}, P = 8.03084 d
HD 181655				181655	94981	19^{h} 19^{m} 39.04^{s}	+37° 19′ 51.5″	6.29	4.28	82	G5V	Spectroscopic binary
HD 168009				168009	89474	18^{h} 15^{m} 32.53^{s}	+45° 12′ 34.5″	6.30	4.52	74	G2V	
HD 181828				181828	95067	19^{h} 20^{m} 33.05^{s}	+35° 11′ 09.4″	6.30	−0.44	726	B9V	
HR 7403			V558	183362	95673	19^{h} 27^{m} 36.40^{s}	+37° 56′ 28.3″	6.30	−2.71	2063	B3Ve	Be star
HD 178003				178003	93770	19^{h} 05^{m} 47.13^{s}	+29° 55′ 18.1″	6.32	−1.70	1309	M0III	suspected variable
HD 179422				179422	94290	19^{h} 11^{m} 30.96^{s}	+26° 44′ 09.4″	6.35	3.18	141	F5V	
Gliese 758				182488	95319	19^{h} 23^{m} 34.01^{s}	+33° 13′ 19.1″	6.37	5.42	51	G8V	has a brown dwarf companion
HD 177109				177109	93437	19^{h} 01^{m} 48.37^{s}	+33° 37′ 16.5″	6.39	−1.27	1109	B5IV	
HD 169646				169646	90163	18^{h} 23^{m} 57.27^{s}	+38° 44′ 21.0″	6.41	−0.69	858	K2	
HD 172958				172958	91675	18^{h} 41^{m} 41.31^{s}	+31° 37′ 03.3″	6.41	−1.24	1105	B8V	
HD 172631				172631	91533	18^{h} 40^{m} 01.93^{s}	+30° 50′ 57.8″	6.43	0.18	580	K0	
HD 176582			V545	176582	93210	18^{h} 59^{m} 12.29^{s}	+39° 13′ 02.4″	6.43	−0.58	821	B5IV	53 Per variable
HD 182635				182635	95370	19^{h} 24^{m} 06.05^{s}	+36° 27′ 06.9″	6.44	1.22	360	K1III	
HD 172741				172741	91552	18^{h} 40^{m} 12.19^{s}	+38° 22′ 01.8″	6.45	0.52	501	A6m	
HD 173383				173383	91820	18^{h} 43^{m} 16.57^{s}	+39° 18′ 00.3″	6.45	−1.65	1358	K5	
V550 Lyr			V550	178329	93808	19^{h} 06^{m} 17.00^{s}	+41° 24′ 50.0″	6.49		2038	B3V	53 Per variable
HD 173087				173087	91707	18^{h} 42^{m} 08.09^{s}	+34° 44′ 46.7″	6.49	−1.55	1320	B5V	
HD 180314				180314	94576	19^{h} 14^{m} 50.21^{s}	+31° 51′ 37.3″	6.61		430	K0	has an unconfirmed planet (b)
HD 178911				178911	94076	19^{h} 09^{m} 04.38^{s}	+34° 36′ 01.6″	6.74	3.29	160	G1V	binary star; component B has a planet (b)
HD 181068				181068	94780	19^{h} 17^{m} 08.98^{s}	+41° 15′ 53.3″	7.09		811	G5	triply eclipsing binary
RR Lyr			RR	182989	95497	19^{h} 25^{m} 27.91^{s}	+42° 47′ 03.7″	7.13	0.34	744	F5	prototype RR Lyr variable, V_{max} = 7.06^{m}, V_{min} = 8.12^{m}, P = 0.56686776 d
HD 177830				177830	93746	19^{h} 05^{m} 20.77^{s}	+25° 55′ 14.4″	7.18	3.32	192	K0	has two planets (b & c)
HD 175370				175370	92668	18^{h} 53^{m} 00.0^{s}	+43° 42′ 49″	7.19		887	K2 III	has a planet (b)
β Lyr B	β	10		174664		18^{h} 50^{m} 06.60^{s}	+33° 21′ 05.0″	7.20				component of the β Lyr system
W Lyr			W	167740	89419	18^{h} 14^{m} 55.88^{s}	+36° 40′ 13.2″	7.30			M3.5-7e	Mira variable, V_{max} = 7.3^{m}, V_{min} = 13^{m}, P = 197.88 d
V478 Lyr			V478	178450	93926	19^{h} 07^{m} 32.39^{s}	+30° 15′ 16.2″	7.63		91.16	G8VSB	RS CVn variable, ΔV = 0.032^{m}, P = 2.185 d
HK Lyr			HK	173291	91774	18^{h} 42^{m} 50.00^{s}	+36° 57′ 30.9″	7.65			C	semiregular variable, V_{max} = 7.5^{m}, V_{min} = 8.4^{m}, P = 186 d
T Lyr			T		90883	18^{h} 32^{m} 20.10^{s}	+36° 59′ 55.6″	7.84		2350	C	slow irregular variable, V_{max} = 7.5^{m}, V_{min} = 9.2^{m}
V Lyr			V	178876		19^{h} 09^{m} 04.55^{s}	+29° 39′ 29.3″	8.2			M7e	Mira variable, V_{max} = 8.2^{m}, V_{min} = 15.7^{m}, P = 373.53 d
Kepler-444					94931	19^{h} 19^{m} 00.55^{s}	+41° 38′ 04.6″	8.86		119	K0V	triple star system; has five transiting planets (b, c, d, e & f)
FL Lyr			FL	179890	94335	19^{h} 12^{m} 04.86^{s}	+46° 19′ 26.9″	9.36		424	G0V	Algol variable, V_{max} = 9.27^{m}, V_{min} = 9.89^{m}, P = 2.178152 d, has a planet (b)
Kepler-37						18^{h} 58^{m} 23.1^{s}	+44° 31′ 05″	9.77		215	G8V	has three planets (b, c and d)
S Lyr			S			19^{h} 13^{m} 11.80^{s}	+26° 00′ 27.8″	9.8			SC	Mira variable, V_{max} = 9.3^{m}, V_{min} = 16.0^{m}, P = 438.4 d
EP Lyr			EP			19^{h} 18^{m} 19.55^{s}	+27° 51′ 03.2″	9.96			G2II	RV Tau variable, V_{max} = 9.96^{m}, V_{min} = 10.90^{m}, P = 83.34 d
Kepler-13 A						19^{h} 07^{m} 53.0^{s}	+46° 52′ 06″	10.0				has a transiting planet (b)
KX Lyr			KX			18^{h} 33^{m} 15.23^{s}	+40° 10′ 22.7″	10.38			F0	RR Lyr variable, V_{max} = 10.38^{m}, V_{min} = 11.47^{m}, P = 0.44090446 d
UZ Lyr			UZ			19^{h} 21^{m} 08.91^{s}	+37° 56′ 11.5″	10.40			A2	Algol variable, V_{max} = 9.9^{m}, V_{min} = 11^{m}, P = 1.89127025 d
HP Lyr			HP			19^{h} 21^{m} 39.07^{s}	+39° 56′ 08.1″	10.43			A6	semiregular variable, V_{max} = 10.18^{m}, V_{min} = 10.80^{m}, P = 68.88 d
WASP-3						18^{h} 34^{m} 31.62^{s}	+35° 39′ 41.5″	10.49	3.75	727	F7V	has the transiting planet (b)
TT Lyr			TT			19^{h} 27^{m} 36.30^{s}	+41° 42′ 05.4″	10.88			B2V	Algol variable, V_{max} = 9.34^{m}, V_{min} = 11.43^{m}, P = 5.243727 d
Kepler-25						19^{h} 06^{m} 33.0^{s}	+39° 29′ 16″	11				has three transiting planets (b, c and d)
Kepler-160						19^{h} 11^{m} 05.6526^{s}	+42° 52′ 09.4725″	11.05		3140		has a three transiting planets and more planets suspected
Kepler-1655						19^{h} 06^{m} 45.4^{s}	+39° 12′ 43″	13.1		751	G0V	has a transiting planet (b)
Kepler-65						19^{h} 14^{m} 45.3^{s}	+41° 09′ 04.2″	11.018			B	has four transiting planets (b, c, d and e)
TZ Lyr			TZ		89498	18^{h} 15^{m} 49.67^{s}	+41° 06′ 37.9″	11.16		736	F5V	β Lyr variable, V_{max} = 1.087^{m}, V_{min} = 11.85^{m}, P = 0.5288269 d
EZ Lyr			EZ		92221	18^{h} 47^{m} 40.32^{s}	+35° 59′ 34.2″	11.34		265.7	A9.7	RR Lyr variable, V_{max} = 10.8^{m}, V_{min} = 11.8^{m}, P = 0.52526769 d
CN Lyr			CN		91634	18^{h} 41^{m} 15.95^{s}	+28° 43′ 21.1″	11.38			F5	RR Lyr variable, V_{max} = 11.07^{m}, V_{min} = 11.76^{m}, P = 0.41138232 d
Kepler-128						18^{h} 49^{m} 58.0^{s}	+43° 58′ 49″	11.4				has two transiting planets (b & c)
RV Lyr			RV			19^{h} 16^{m} 17.97^{s}	+32° 25′ 15.0″	11.47			A5	Algol variable
Kepler-102						18^{h} 45^{m} 55.9^{s}	+47° 12′ 29″	11.49				has five transiting planets (b, c, d, e & f)
RZ Lyr			RZ			18^{h} 43^{m} 37.88^{s}	+32° 47′ 54.0″	11.57			A2	RR Lyr variable, V_{max} = 10.6^{m}, V_{min} = 12.03^{m}, P = 0.5112423 d
Kepler-131						19^{h} 14^{m} 07.4^{s}	+40° 56′ 32″	11.53				has two transiting planets (b & c)
Kepler-454						19^{h} 09^{m} 55.0^{s}	+38° 13′ 44″	11.57				has three transiting planets (b, c & d)
Kepler-1656						18^{h} 57^{m} 53.0^{s}	+39° 54′ 43″	11.6				has a transiting planet (b)
Kepler-92						19^{h} 16^{m} 21.0^{s}	+41° 33′ 47″	11.6		1463		has three transiting planets (b, c & d)
WASP-58						18^{h} 18^{m} 48.0^{s}	+45° 10′ 19″	11.66		978	G2V	has a transiting planet (b)
V404 Lyr			V404			19^{h} 19^{m} 05.95^{s}	+38° 22′ 00.5″	11.77				Algol variable
GSC 02652-01324						19^{h} 04^{m} 09.84^{s}	+36° 37′ 57.5″	11.79	5.81	512	K0V	has the transiting planet TrES-1
HAT-P-5						18^{h} 17^{m} 37.30^{s}	+36° 37′ 16.9″	11.95	4.29	1110	G	Chason; has the transiting planet HAT-P-5b
Kepler-19						19^{h} 21^{m} 41.0^{s}	+37° 51′ 06″	12.00				has three transiting planets (b, c & d)
Kepler-103						19^{h} 15^{m} 26.3^{s}	+40° 03′ 52″	12.29		1545		has two transiting planets (b & c)
Kepler-95						18^{h} 57^{m} 55.8^{s}	+44° 23′ 53″	12.35				has a transiting planet (b)
Kepler-109						19^{h} 21^{m} 34.2^{s}	+40° 17′ 06″	12.37		1516		has two transiting planets (b & c)
CC Lyr			CC		91015	18^{h} 33^{m} 57.41^{s}	+31° 38′ 24.2″	12.46			F0p...	W Vir variable, V_{max} = 11.65^{m}, V_{min} = 12.45^{m}, P = 24.16 d
Kepler-20						19^{h} 10^{m} 48.0^{s}	+42° 20′ 19″	12.5		946	G8	has six transiting planets (b, c, d, e, f & g)
WASP-153						18^{h} 37^{m} 03.0^{s}	+40° 01′ 07″	12.8		1402		has a transiting planet (b)
Kepler-94						18^{h} 44^{m} 46.7^{s}	+47° 29′ 50″	12.9				has two transiting planets (b & c)
Kepler-91						19^{h} 02^{m} 41.0^{s}	+44° 07′ 00″	12.9		3359		has a transiting planet (b)
Kepler-93						19^{h} 25^{m} 40.4^{s}	+38° 40′ 20.4″	10.0		313.7	G5V	has a transiting planet (b) and a likely brown dwarf companion (c)
Kepler-7						19^{h} 14^{m} 19.56^{s}	+41° 05′ 23.3″	13.3	3.9	1200	G1	has a transiting planet (b)
Kepler-277						19^{h} 06^{m} 20.0^{s}	+39° 04′ 38″	13.4				has two transiting planets (b & c)
β Lyr C	β	10		174639		18^{h} 50^{m} 01.20^{s}	+33° 21′ 26.0″	13.40				component of the β Lyr system
Kepler-138						19^{h} 21^{m} 32.0^{s}	+43° 17′ 35″	13.50			M1V	has three transiting planets (b, c & d)
Kepler-88						19^{h} 24^{m} 36.0^{s}	+40° 40′ 10″	13.50		1256	B	has three transiting planets (b, c & d)
Kepler-422						18^{h} 50^{m} 31.1^{s}	+46° 19′ 24″	13.64				has a transiting planet (b)
Kepler-279						19^{h} 09^{m} 34.0^{s}	+42° 11′ 42″	13.7				has three transiting planets (b, c & d)
Kepler-412						19^{h} 04^{m} 26.0^{s}	+43° 40′ 51″	13.73		3444	G3V	has a transiting planet (b)
Kepler-62						18^{h} 52^{m} 51.0^{s}	+45° 20′ 59.4″	13.75		~1200	K2V	has five transiting planets (b, c, d, e and f)
Kepler-350						19^{h} 01^{m} 41.0^{s}	+39° 42′ 22″	13.8				has three transiting planets (b, c & d)
Kepler-8						18^{h} 45^{m} 09.15^{s}	+42° 27′ 03.9″	13.9	3.3	4338	F9	has a transiting planet (b)
Kepler-9						19^{h} 02^{m} 18^{s}	+38° 24′ 03″	13.9		2300	G2V	has three transiting planets (b, c & d)
Kepler-43						19^{h} 00^{m} 58.0^{s}	+46° 40′ 06″	14.0		6360	G0V/G0IV	has a transiting planet (b)
Kepler-460						19^{h} 13^{m} 54.0^{s}	+40° 39′ 05″	14.2				has two transiting planets (b & c)
Kepler-38						19^{h} 07^{m} 19.0^{s}	+42° 16′ 45″	14.3				The star A has transiting planet (b)
Kepler-60						19^{h} 15^{m} 51.0^{s}	+42° 15′ 54″	14.5				has three transiting planets (b, c and d)
Kepler-423						19^{h} 31^{m} 25.4^{s}	+46° 23′ 28″	14.5				has a transiting planet (b)
Kepler-59						19^{h} 08^{m} 09.0^{s}	+46° 38′ 24″	14.8				has two transiting planets (b and c)
Kepler-438						18^{h} 46^{m} 35.0^{s}	+41° 57′ 04″	15		473		has a transiting planet (b)
Kepler-439						18^{h} 43^{m} 12.0^{s}	+44° 02′ 02″	15		2260		has a transiting planet (b)
Kepler-75						19^{h} 24^{m} 33.0^{s}	+36° 34′ 39″	15		3718	G8V	has a transiting planet (b)
Kepler-177						19^{h} 04^{m} 11.0^{s}	+45° 03′ 12″	15				has two transiting planets (b & c)
V477 Lyr			V477			18^{h} 31^{m} 18.29^{s}	+26° 56′ 12.9″	15.07			O9k	Algol variable; central star of planetary nebula Abell 46
Kepler-282						18^{h} 58^{m} 43.0^{s}	+44° 47′ 51″	15.2				has four transiting planets (b, c, d & e)
Kepler-442						19^{h} 01^{m} 28.0^{s}	+39° 16′ 48″	15.3		1115		has a transiting planet (b)
Kepler-440						19^{h} 01^{m} 24.0^{s}	+41° 27′ 08″	15.5		851		has a transiting planet (b)
Kepler-24						19^{h} 21^{m} 39^{s}	+38° 20′ 38″	15.5				has two transiting planets (b and c) and two unconfirmed planet (d and e)
Kepler-30						19^{h} 01^{m} 08.0^{s}	+38° 56′ 50″	15.5				has three transiting planets (b, c and d)
Kepler-428						19^{h} 22^{m} 20.0^{s}	+40° 34′ 39″	15.5		2381		has a transiting planet (b)
Kepler-26						18^{h} 59^{m} 46^{s}	+46° 34′ 00″	16				has four transiting planets (b, c, d & e)
Kepler-53						19^{h} 21^{m} 51.0^{s}	+40° 33′ 45″	16				has three transiting planets (b, c and d)
Kepler-55						19^{h} 00^{m} 40.0^{s}	+44° 01′ 35″	16.3				has five transiting planets (b, c, d, e and f)
Kepler-446						18^{h} 49^{m} 00.0^{s}	+44° 55′ 16″	16.5				has three transiting planets (b, c & d)
Kepler-83						18^{h} 48^{m} 55.8^{s}	+43° 39′ 56″	16.51				has three transiting planets (b, c & d)
HR Lyr			HR	175268		18^{h} 53^{m} 25.05^{s}	+29° 13′ 37.7″	16.6				nova, V_{max} = 6.5^{m}, V_{min} = 16.6^{m}
CY Lyr			CY			18^{h} 52^{m} 41.38^{s}	+26° 45′ 31.5″	18.0				SS Cyg variable, V_{max} = 12.9^{m}, V_{min} = 18.0^{m}, P = 0.1951 d
DM Lyr			DM			18^{h} 58^{m} 44.43^{s}	+30° 15′ 33.0″	18				SU UMa variable, V_{max} = 13^{m}, V_{min} = 18^{m}, P = 0.065409 d
2MASS 1835+3259						18^{h} 35^{m} 39.90^{s}	+32° 59′ 54.6″	18.27		18.48	M8.5V	brown dwarf
V344 Lyr			V344			18^{h} 44^{m} 39.18^{s}	+43° 22′ 28.1″	19				SU UMa variable, V_{max} = 13.8^{m}, V_{min} = 19^{m}, P = 0.087904 d
V361 Lyr			V361			19^{h} 02^{m} 28.12^{s}	+46° 58′ 57.8″				F9V	Algol variable
AY Lyr			AY			18^{h} 44^{m} 26.73^{s}	+37° 59′ 51.8″				G...	SU UMa variable
MV Lyr			MV			19^{h} 07^{m} 16.29^{s}	+44° 01′ 07.8″				Op+...	nova
WISE 1828+2650						18^{h} 28^{m} 31.08^{s}	+26° 50′ 37.8″			47	Y0	brown dwarf
WISEP J190648.47+401106.8						19^{h} 06^{m} 48.47^{s}	+40° 11′ 06.8″			53.3	L1	brown dwarf
Table legend: Name = Proper name; B = Bayer designation; F or/and G. = Flamsteed designation or Gould designation; Var = Variable-star designation; HD = Henry Draper Catalogue designation number; HIP = Hipparcos Catalogue designation number; RA = Right ascension for the Epoch/Equinox J2000.0; Dec = Declination for the Epoch/Equinox J2000.0; vis. mag. = visual magnitude (m or m_{v}), also known as apparent magnitude; abs. mag. = absolute magnitude (M_{v}); Dist. (ly) = Distance in light-years from Earth; Sp. class = Spectral class of the star in the stellar classification system; Notes = Common name(s) or alternate name(s); comments; notable properties [for example: multiple star status, range of variability if it is a variable star, exoplanets, etc.]

== See also ==
- List of stars by constellation
