= Terrestrial planet =

Planet that is composed primarily of silicate rocks or metals

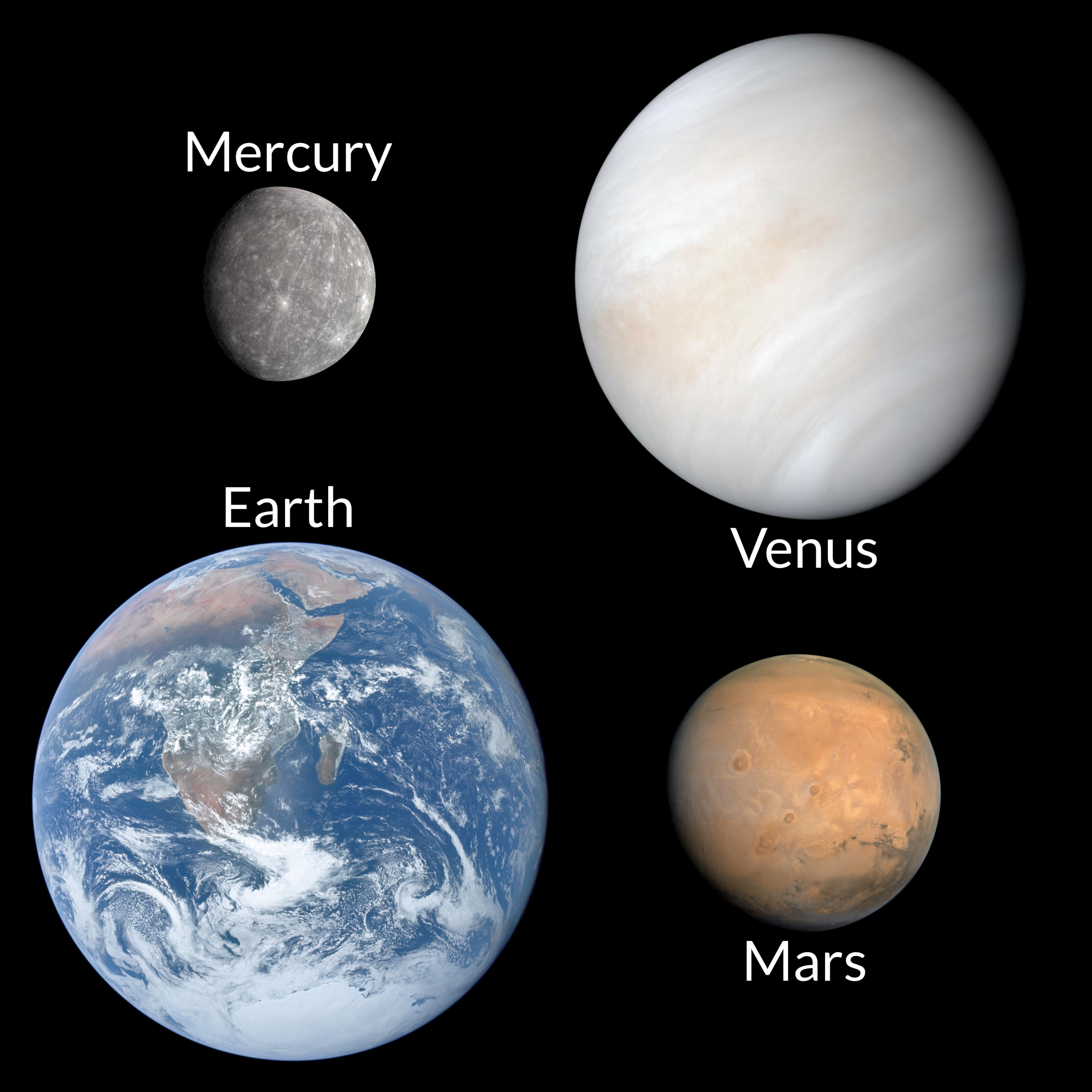
The four terrestrial planets of the Solar System: Mercury, Venus, Earth and Mars Shown to scale

A terrestrial planet is a class of planet that is composed primarily of silicate, rocks, or metals. It may instead be referred to as a tellurian planet, telluric planet, or rocky planet. Within the Solar System, the terrestrial planets accepted by the International Astronomical Union are the inner planets closest to the Sun: Mercury, Venus, Earth and Mars. Among astronomers who use the geophysical definition of a planet, two or three planetary-mass satellites – Earth's Moon, Io, and sometimes Europa – may also count as terrestrial planets. The large rocky asteroids Pallas and Vesta are sometimes included as well, albeit rarely. The terms "terrestrial planet" and "telluric planet" are derived from Latin words for Earth (Terra and Tellus), as these planets are, in terms of structure, Earth-like. Terrestrial planets are generally studied by geologists, astronomers, and geophysicists.

Terrestrial planets have a solid planetary surface, making them substantially different from larger gaseous planets, which are composed mostly of some combination of hydrogen, helium, and water existing in various physical states.

== Structure ==
All terrestrial planets in the Solar System have the same basic structure, such as a central metallic core (mostly iron) with a surrounding silicate mantle.

The large rocky asteroid 4 Vesta has a similar structure; possibly so does the smaller one 21 Lutetia. Another rocky asteroid 2 Pallas is about the same size as Vesta, but is significantly less dense; it appears to have never differentiated a core and a mantle. The Earth's Moon and Jupiter's moon Io have similar structures to terrestrial planets, but Earth's Moon has a much smaller iron core. Another Jovian moon Europa has a similar density but has a significant ice layer on the surface: for this reason, it is sometimes considered an icy planet instead.

Terrestrial planets can have surface structures such as canyons, craters, mountains, volcanoes, and others, depending on the presence at any time of an erosive liquid or tectonic activity or both.

Terrestrial planets have secondary atmospheres, generated by volcanic out-gassing or from comet impact debris. This contrasts with the outer, giant planets, whose atmospheres are primary; primary atmospheres were captured directly from the original solar nebula.

== Terrestrial planets within the Solar System ==
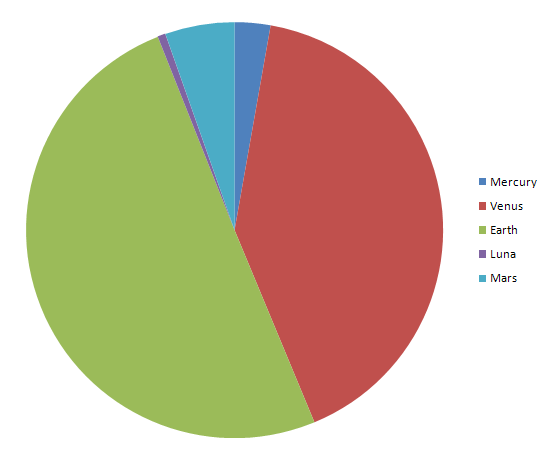
Relative masses of the terrestrial planets of the Solar System, and the Moon (shown here as Luna)

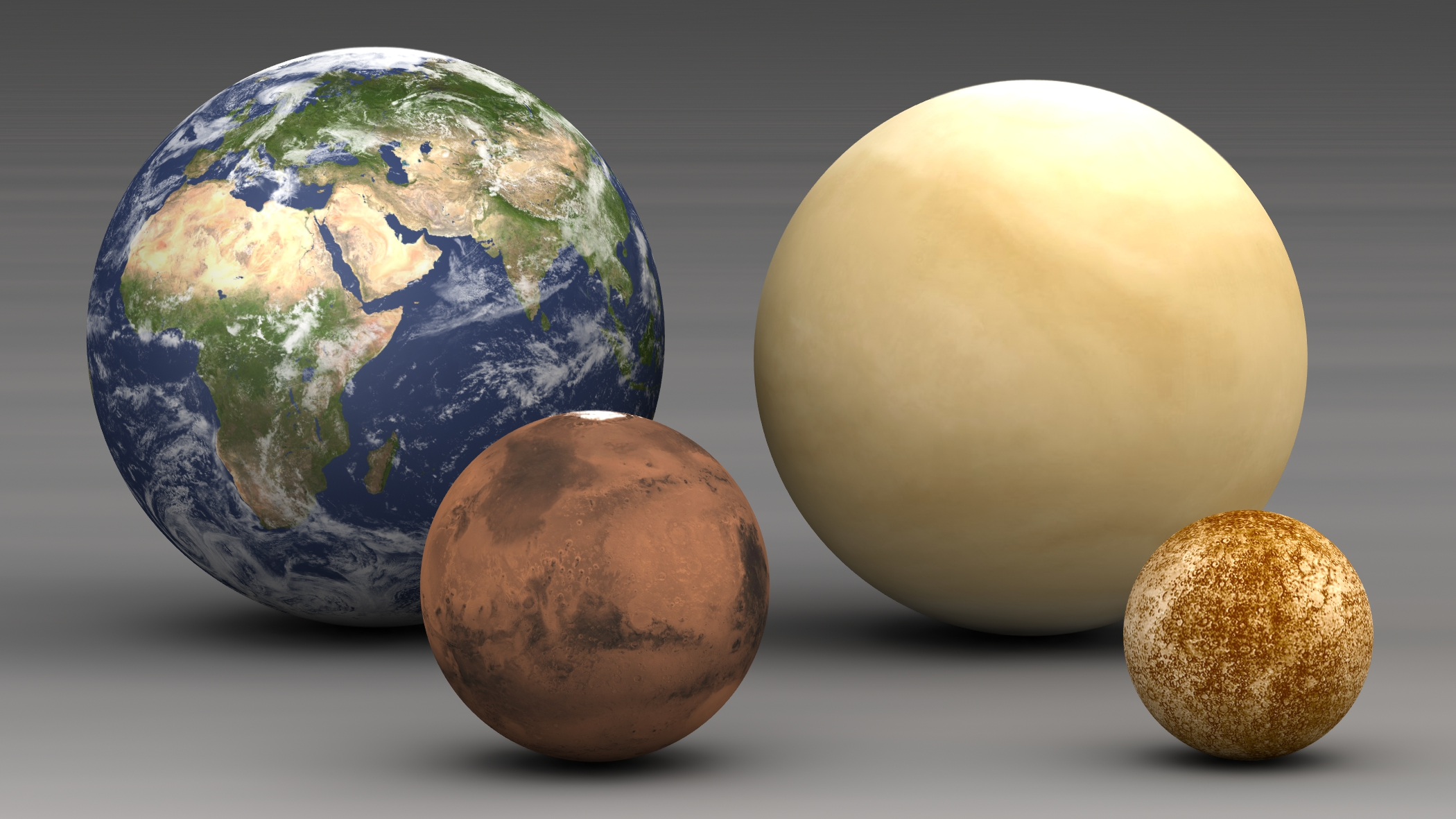
The inner planets (sizes to scale). From left to right: Earth, Mars, Venus and Mercury.

The Solar System has four terrestrial planets under the dynamical definition: Mercury, Venus, Earth and Mars. The Earth's Moon as well as Jupiter's moons Io and Europa would also count geophysically, as well as perhaps the large protoplanet-asteroids Pallas and Vesta (though those are borderline cases). Among these bodies, only the Earth has an active surface hydrosphere. Europa is believed to have an active hydrosphere under its ice layer.

During the formation of the Solar System, there were many terrestrial planetesimals and proto-planets, but most merged with or were ejected by the four terrestrial planets, leaving only Pallas and Vesta to survive more or less intact. These two were likely both dwarf planets in the past, but have been battered out of equilibrium shapes by impacts. Some other protoplanets began to accrete and differentiate but suffered catastrophic collisions that left only a metallic or rocky core, like 16 Psyche or 8 Flora respectively. Many S-type and M-type asteroids may be such fragments.

The other round bodies from the asteroid belt outward are geophysically icy planets. They are similar to terrestrial planets in that they have a solid surface, but are composed of ice and rock rather than of rock and metal. These include the dwarf planets, such as Ceres, Pluto and Eris, which are found today only in the regions beyond the formation snow line where water ice was stable under direct sunlight in the early Solar System. It also includes the other round moons, which are ice-rock (e.g. Ganymede, Callisto, Titan, and Triton) or even almost pure (at least 99%) ice (Tethys and Iapetus). Some of these bodies are known to have subsurface hydrospheres (Ganymede, Callisto, Enceladus, and Titan), like Europa, and it is also possible for some others (e.g. Ceres, Mimas, Dione, Miranda, Ariel, Triton, and Pluto). Titan even has surface bodies of liquid, albeit liquid methane rather than water. Jupiter's Ganymede, though icy, does have a metallic core like the Moon, Io, Europa, and the terrestrial planets.

The name Terran world has been suggested to define all solid worlds (bodies assuming a rounded shape), without regard to their composition. It would thus include both terrestrial and icy planets.

=== Density trends ===
The uncompressed density of a terrestrial planet is the average density its materials would have at zero pressure. A greater uncompressed density indicates a greater metal content. Uncompressed density differs from the true average density (also often called "bulk" density) because compression within planet cores increases their density; the average density depends on planet size, temperature distribution, and material stiffness as well as composition.

Calculations to estimate uncompressed density inherently require a model of the planet's structure. Where there have been landers or multiple orbiting spacecraft, these models are constrained by seismological data and also moment of inertia data derived from the spacecraft's orbits. Where such data is not available, uncertainties are inevitably higher.

The uncompressed densities of the rounded terrestrial bodies directly orbiting the Sun trend towards lower values as the distance from the Sun increases, consistent with the temperature gradient that would have existed within the primordial solar nebula. The Galilean satellites show a similar trend going outwards from Jupiter; however, no such trend is observable for the icy satellites of Saturn or Uranus. The icy worlds typically have densities less than 2 g·cm^{−3}. Eris is significantly denser (2.43±0.05 g·cm^{−3}), and may be mostly rocky with some surface ice, like Europa. It is unknown whether extrasolar terrestrial planets in general will follow such a trend.

The data in the tables below are mostly taken from a list of gravitationally rounded objects of the Solar System and planetary-mass moon. All distances from the Sun are averages.

Densities of the terrestrial geophysical planets (including borderline Pallas and Vesta)
Object	Density (g·cm^{−3})		Distance from Sun (AU)
Object	Mean	Uncompressed	Distance from Sun (AU)
Mercury	5.4	5.3	0.39
Venus	5.2	4.4	0.72
Earth	5.5	4.4	1.0
Moon	3.3	3.3	1.0
Mars	3.9	3.8	1.52
Vesta	3.5	3.5	2.36
Pallas	2.9	2.9	2.77
Io	3.5	3.5	5.20
Europa	3.0	3.0	5.20

Densities of some icy geophysical planets (including borderline Hygiea and Salacia; Sedna's density is poorly known)
Object	Density (g·cm^{−3})	Distance from Sun (AU)
Ceres	2.2	2.77
Hygiea	2.1	3.14
Ganymede	1.9	5.20
Callisto	1.8	5.20
Mimas	1.2	9.54
Enceladus	1.6	9.54
Tethys	1.0	9.54
Dione	1.5	9.54
Rhea	1.2	9.54
Titan	1.9	9.54
Iapetus	1.1	9.54
Miranda	1.2	19.2
Ariel	1.6	19.2
Umbriel	1.5	19.2
Titania	1.7	19.2
Oberon	1.6	19.2
Triton	2.1	30.1
Orcus	1.4	39.4
Pluto	1.9	39.5
Charon	1.7	39.5
Salacia	1.5	42.2
Haumea	2.1	43.1
Quaoar	1.7	43.7
Makemake	1.8	45.5
Gonggong	1.7	66.9
Eris	2.4	67.9

== Extrasolar terrestrial planets ==
Most of the planets discovered outside the Solar System are giant planets, because they are more easily detectable. But since 2005, hundreds of potentially terrestrial extrasolar planets have also been found, with several being confirmed as terrestrial. Most of these are super-Earths, i.e. planets with masses between Earth's and Neptune's; super-Earths may be gas planets or terrestrial, depending on their mass and other parameters.

During the early 1990s, the first extrasolar planets were discovered orbiting the pulsar PSR B1257+12, with masses of 0.02, 4.3, and 3.9 times that of Earth, by pulsar timing.

When 51 Pegasi b, the first planet found around a star still undergoing fusion, was discovered, many astronomers assumed it to be a gigantic terrestrial, because it was assumed no gas giant could exist as close to its star (0.052 AU) as 51 Pegasi b did, but it was later found to be a gas giant.

In 2005, the first planets orbiting a main-sequence star and which showed signs of being terrestrial planets were found: Gliese 876 d and OGLE-2005-BLG-390Lb. Gliese 876 d orbits the red dwarf Gliese 876, 15 light years from Earth, and has a mass seven to nine times that of Earth and an orbital period of just two Earth days. OGLE-2005-BLG-390Lb has about 5.5 times the mass of Earth and orbits a star about 21,000 light-years away in the constellation Scorpius.

From 2007 to 2010, three (possibly four) potential terrestrial planets were found orbiting within the Gliese 581 planetary system. The smallest, Gliese 581e, is only about 1.9 Earth masses, but orbits very close to the star. Two others, Gliese 581c and the disputed Gliese 581d, are more-massive super-Earths orbiting in or close to the habitable zone of the star, so they could potentially be habitable, with Earth-like temperatures.

Another possibly terrestrial planet, HD 85512 b, was discovered in 2011; it has at least 3.6 times the mass of Earth. The radius and composition of all these planets are unknown.

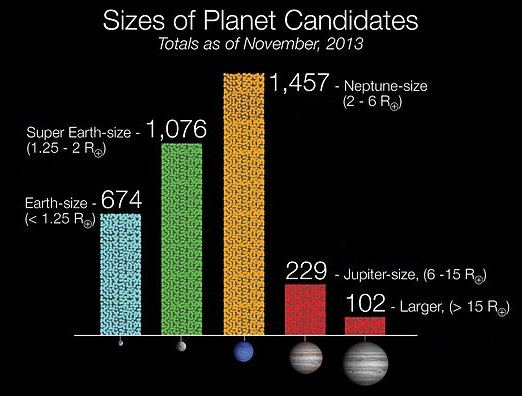
Sizes of Kepler planet candidates based on 2,740 candidates orbiting 2,036 stars as of 4 November 2013 (NASA)

The first confirmed terrestrial exoplanet, Kepler-10b, was found in 2011 by the Kepler space telescope, specifically designed to discover Earth-size planets around other stars using the transit method.

In the same year, the Kepler space telescope mission team released a list of 1235 extrasolar planet candidates, including six that are "Earth-size" or "super-Earth-size" (i.e. they have a radius less than twice that of the Earth) and in the habitable zone of their star. Since then, Kepler has discovered hundreds of planets ranging from Moon-sized to super-Earths, with many more candidates in this size range (see image).

In 2016, statistical modeling of the relationship between a planet's mass and radius using a broken power law appeared to suggest that the transition point between rocky, terrestrial worlds and mini-Neptunes without a defined surface was in fact very close to Earth and Venus's masses, suggesting that rocky worlds much larger than our own are in fact quite rare. This resulted in some advocating for the retirement of the term "super-earth" as being scientifically misleading. Since 2016 the catalog of known exoplanets has increased significantly, and there have been several published refinements of the mass-radius model. As of 2024, the expected transition point between rocky and intermediate-mass planets sits at roughly 4.4 earth masses, and roughly 1.6 earth radii.

In September 2020, astronomers using microlensing techniques reported the detection, for the first time, of an Earth-mass rogue planet (named OGLE-2016-BLG-1928L) unbounded by any star, and free-floating in the Milky Way galaxy.

=== List of terrestrial exoplanets ===
The following exoplanets have a density of at least 5 g/cm^{3} and a mass below Neptune's and are thus very likely terrestrial:

Kepler-10b, Kepler-20b, Kepler-36b, Kepler-48d, Kepler 68c, Kepler-78b, Kepler-89b, Kepler-93b, Kepler-97b, Kepler-99b, Kepler-100b, Kepler-101c, Kepler-102b, Kepler-102d, Kepler-113b, Kepler-131b, Kepler-131c, Kepler-138c, Kepler-406b, Kepler-406c, Kepler-409b.

=== Frequency ===
In 2013, astronomers reported, based on Kepler space mission data, that there could be as many as 40 billion Earth- and super-Earth-sized planets orbiting in the habitable zones of Sun-like stars and red dwarfs within the Milky Way. Eleven billion of these estimated planets may be orbiting Sun-like stars. The nearest such planet may be 12 light-years away, according to the scientists. However, this does not give estimates for the number of extrasolar terrestrial planets, because there are planets as small as Earth that have been shown to be gas planets (see Kepler-138d).

Estimates show that about 80% of potentially habitable worlds are covered by land, and about 20% are ocean planets. Planets with ratios more like those of Earth, which was 30% land and 70% ocean, only make up 1% of these worlds.

== Types ==
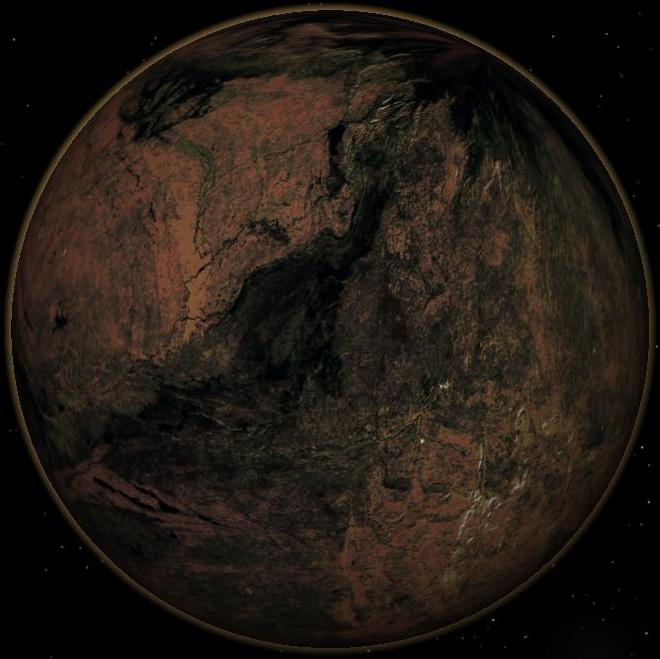
Artist's impression of a carbon planet

Several possible classifications for solid planets have been proposed.

Silicate planet
A solid planet like Venus, Earth, or Mars, made primarily of a silicon-based rocky mantle with a metallic (iron) core.
Carbon planet (also called "diamond planet")
A theoretical class of planets, composed of a metal core surrounded by primarily carbon-based minerals. They may be considered a type of terrestrial planet if the metal content dominates. The Solar System contains no carbon planets but does have carbonaceous asteroids, such as Ceres and Hygiea. It is unknown if Ceres has a rocky or metallic core.
Iron planet
A theoretical type of solid planet that consists almost entirely of iron and therefore has a greater density and a smaller radius than other solid planets of comparable mass. Mercury in the Solar System has a metallic core equal to 60–70% of its planetary mass, and is sometimes called an iron planet, though its surface is made of silicates and is iron-poor. Iron planets are thought to form in the high-temperature regions close to a star, like Mercury, and if the protoplanetary disk is rich in iron.
Icy planet

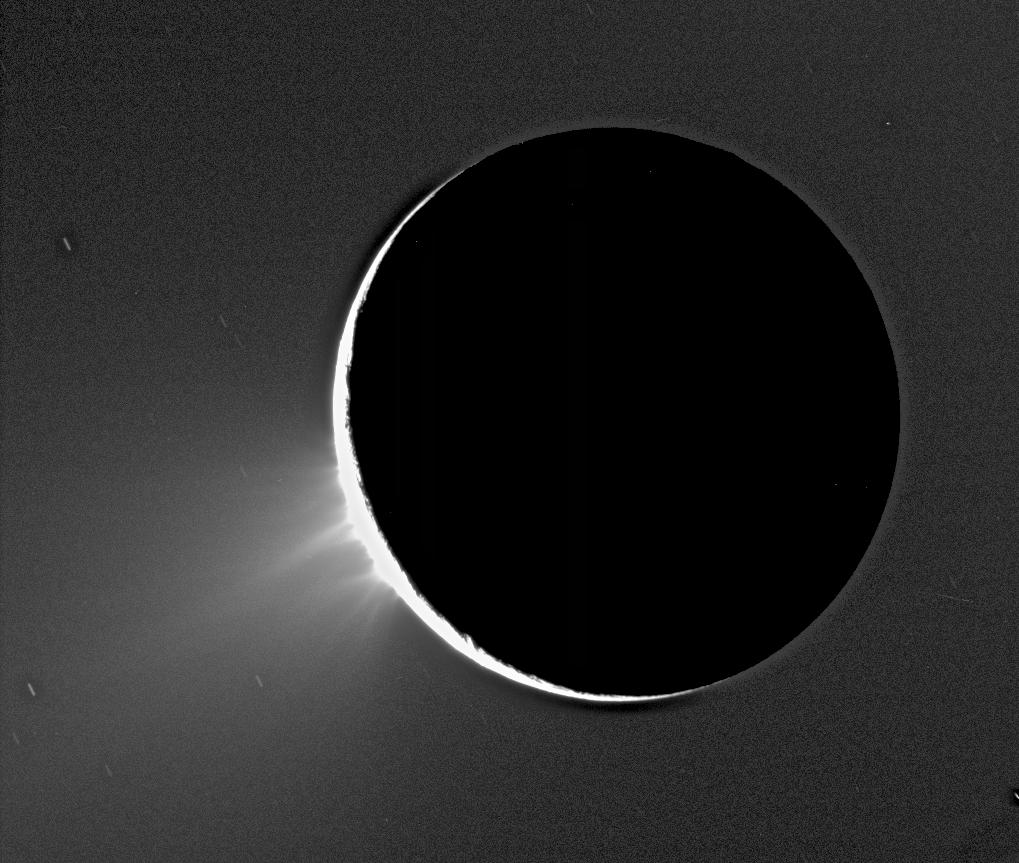
Geysers erupting on Enceladus

A type of solid planet with an icy surface of volatiles. In the Solar System, most planetary-mass moons (such as Titan, Triton, and Enceladus) and many dwarf planets (such as Pluto and Eris) have such a composition. Europa is sometimes considered an icy planet due to its surface ice, but its higher density indicates that its interior is mostly rocky. Such planets can have internal saltwater oceans and cryovolcanoes erupting liquid water (i.e. an internal hydrosphere, like Europa or Enceladus); they can have an atmosphere and hydrosphere made from methane or nitrogen (like Titan). A metallic core is possible, as exists on Ganymede.
Coreless planet
A theoretical type of solid planet that consists of silicate rock but has no metallic core, i.e. the opposite of an iron planet. Although the Solar System contains no coreless planets, chondrite asteroids and meteorites are common in the Solar System. Ceres and Pallas have mineral compositions similar to carbonaceous chondrites, though Pallas is significantly less hydrated. Coreless planets are thought to form farther from the star where volatile oxidizing material is more common.

== See also ==
- Chthonian planet
- Black dwarf
- Desert planet
- Earth analog
- List of potentially habitable exoplanets
- Planetary habitability
- Venus zone
- List of gravitationally rounded objects of the Solar System
