= DM Lyrae =

Dwarf nova in the constellation Lyra

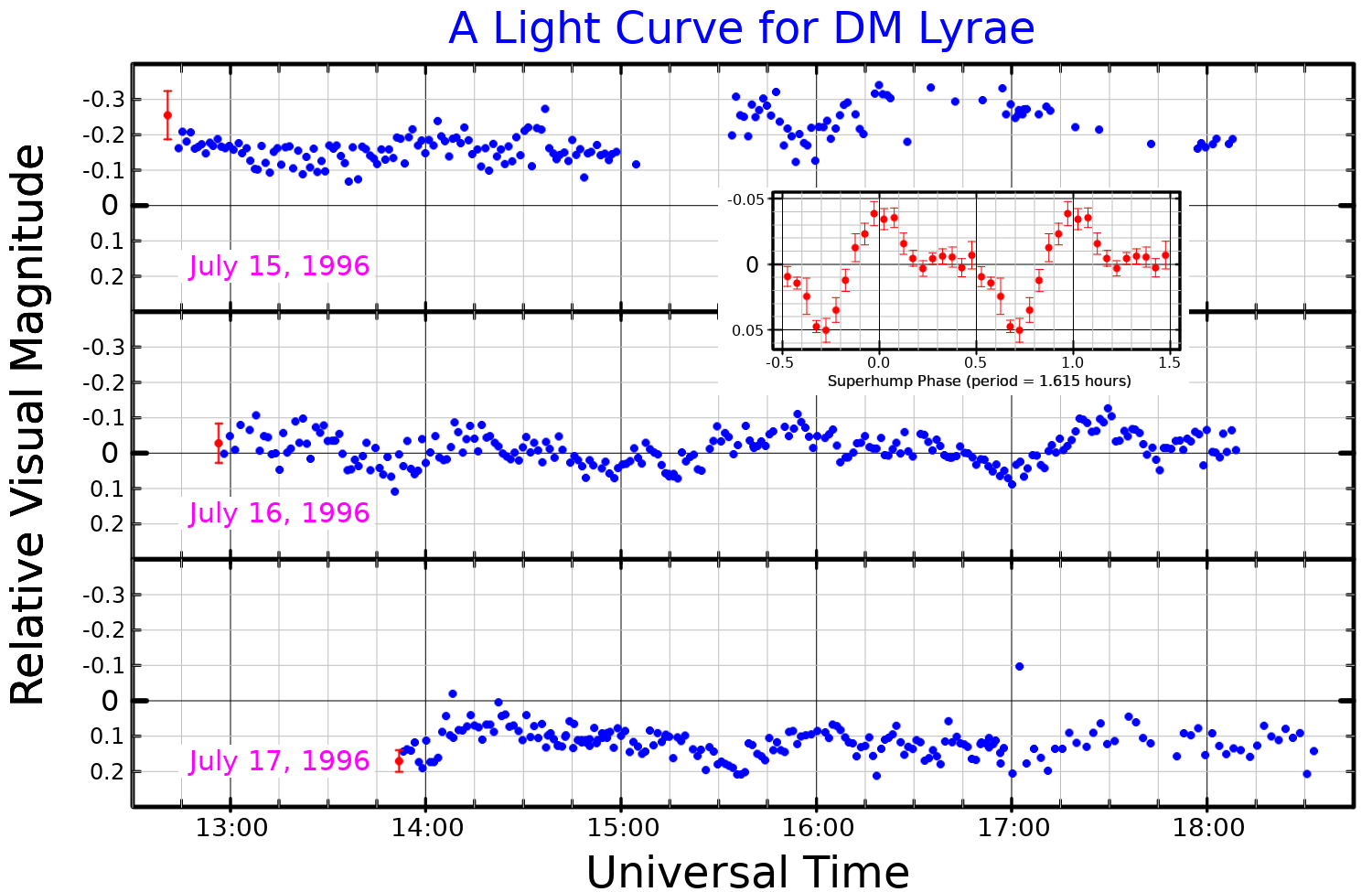
- A visual band light curve for DM Lyrae, adapted from Nogami et al. (2003). The inset plot shows the superhump variations.

Observation data Epoch J2000.0 Equinox J2000.0
- Constellation: Lyra
- Right ascension: 18^{h} 58^{m} 44.43^{s}
- Declination: +30° 15′ 33.0″
- Apparent magnitude (V): +18 (quiet), +13.6 (burst)

Characteristics
- Spectral type: ? / White dwarf
- Variable type: SU UMa

Orbit
Period (P)	0.0654092±0.000002 d
Periastron epoch (T)	2,451,343.8565±0.0015 HJD
Semi-amplitude (K_{1}) (primary)	37±5 km/s

Details

Donor star
Mass	0.095±0.022 M_{☉}
Radius	0.145±0.011 R_{☉}

Other designations
- Lyr 1928, AN 250.1929, 1RXS J185845.1+301548, AAVSO 1854+30, DM Lyr

Database references
SIMBAD	data

DM Lyrae (DM Lyr for short) is a dwarf nova in the constellation Lyra. This binary system is composed of a primary star of unknown type, and a white dwarf companion. It erupted in 1928 and 1996 and reached about magnitude 13.

== See also ==
- RS Ophiuchi
- HR Lyrae
- V838 Monocerotis
