= HD 174881 =

Binary star in the constellation Lyra

- Location of HD 174881 (circled)

Observation data Epoch J2000 Equinox J2000
- Constellation: Lyra
- Right ascension: 18^{h} 51^{m} 35.8920^{s}
- Declination: +28° 47′ 01.219″
- Apparent magnitude (V): +6.209

Characteristics
- Evolutionary stage: red giant branch (A) red clump (B)
- Spectral type: K1II-III

Astrometry
Radial velocity (R_{v})	−19.101+0.034 −0.043 km/s
Proper motion (μ)	RA: +1.649 mas/yr Dec.: +4.811 mas/yr
Parallax (π)	2.525+0.014 −0.015 mas
Distance	1,290+7.8 −7.2 ly (396.0+2.4 −2.2 pc)
Absolute magnitude (M_{V})	−1.462±0.065 (A) −1.042±0.066 (B)

Orbit
Primary	A
Name	B
Period (P)	215.1166+0.0092 −0.0072 days
Semi-major axis (a)	1.3336+0.0060 −0.0051 AU
Eccentricity (e)	0.12162+0.00063 −0.00064
Inclination (i)	38.73±0.17°
Longitude of the node (Ω)	263.65±0.15°
Argument of periastron (ω) (primary)	101.98+0.36 −0.34°
Semi-amplitude (K_{1}) (primary)	21.594±0.053 km/s
Semi-amplitude (K_{2}) (secondary)	20.924+0.062 −0.057 km/s

Details

A
Mass	3.367+0.045 −0.041 M_{☉}
Radius	34.0±1.3 R_{☉}
Luminosity	456 L_{☉}
Surface gravity (log g)	1.903±0.033 cgs
Temperature	4,620±150 K
Age	255–273 Myr

B
Mass	3.476±0.043 M_{☉}
Radius	22.7±1.8 R_{☉}
Luminosity	250 L_{☉}
Surface gravity (log g)	2.262+0.075 −0.059 cgs
Temperature	4,880±150 K
Age	255–273 Myr

Other designations
- BD+28 3104, HD 174881, HIP 92550, HR 7112, SAO 86512

Database references
SIMBAD	data

HD 174881 is a binary star located in the northern constellation of Lyra, the lyre. This system has an apparent visual magnitude of +6.209, making it faintly visible to the naked eye only in very dark skies, with no light pollution. Based on dynamical parallax measurements inferred from the binary's orbit, it is about 1,300 light-years distant. At that distance, the apparent magnitude is diminished by 0.22 magnitudes due to extinction by gas and dust between Earth and HD 174881.

This binary system is composed of two evolved giant stars that exhausted their hydrogen supply at their core and expanded in size. They complete an orbit around each other every 215 days (7.1 months), and are separated by 1.3 astronomical units. The orbit is close to circular, with a low eccentricity of 0.12. The primary and secondary star are over three times more massive than the Sun, with radii 34 and 23 times higher, respectively, and luminosities 460 and 250 times solar. Their effective temperatures are 4,620 and 4,880 K, giving them an orange hue typical of K-type stars. The age of the system is estimated at 250 million years.

HD 174881 was first detected as a binary in 1995 by spectroscopic observations. Subsequently, observations have been made that significantly improved the orbit and spatially resolved the binary for the first time, as well as providing valuable tests of stellar evolution in evolved stars.

There is evidence of an infrared excess around this system, suggesting it is surrounded by cold dust with temperatures between 15 and 20 K. This could also explain the observed extinction.
