= Kepler-24 =

Star in the constellation Lyra

Observation data Epoch J2000 Equinox J2000
- Constellation: Lyra
- Right ascension: 19^{h} 21^{m} 39.1857^{s}
- Declination: +38° 20′ 37.450″
- Apparent magnitude (V): 15.5

Characteristics
- Evolutionary stage: main sequence
- Spectral type: G5

Astrometry
| Proper motion (μ) | RA: −2.153(22) mas/yr Dec.: −1.822(21) mas/yr |
| Parallax (π) | 0.8312±0.0186 mas |
| Distance | 3,920 ± 90 ly (1,200 ± 30 pc) |

Details
| Mass | 1.11 M_{☉} |
| Radius | 1.07 ± 0.16 R_{☉} |
| Luminosity | 0.79 ± 0.04 L_{☉} |
| Temperature | 5800 ± 200 K |
| Metallicity [Fe/H] | –0.24 ± 0.40 dex |
| Rotation | 10.080±0.154 days |

Other designations
- KOI-1102, KIC 3231341, 2MASS J19213918+3820375, Gaia DR2 2052823535171095296

Database references
| SIMBAD | data |
| Exoplanet Archive | data |
| KIC | data |

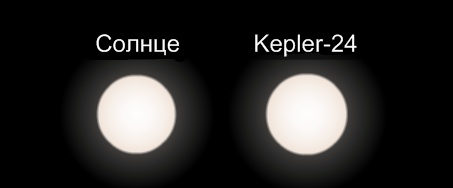
Comparative sizes of Sun and Kepler-24.

Kepler-24 is a star in the northern constellation of Lyra. It is located at the celestial coordinates: Right Ascension 19^{h} 21^{m} 39.1857^{s}, Declination +38° 20′ 37.450″. With an apparent visual magnitude of 15.5, this star is too faint to be seen with the naked eye.

== Planetary system ==
Two planetary candidates b and c were discovered in 2011, and were confirmed in 2012 together with d and e.

The Kepler-24 planetary system
| Companion (in order from star) | Mass | Semimajor axis (AU) | Orbital period (days) | Eccentricity | Inclination | Radius |
|---|---|---|---|---|---|---|
| d | — | 0.051 | 4.244384 | — | — | 1.67 R_{🜨} |
| b | < 1.6 M_{J} | 0.106 | 8.1453 | — | — | 2.4 R_{🜨} |
| c | < 1.6 M_{J} | 0.068 | 12.3335 | — | — | 2.8 R_{🜨} |
| e | — | 0.138 | 18.998355 | — | — | 2.78 R_{🜨} |
