= Kepler-26 =

Star in the constellation Lyra

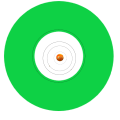
- The Kepler-26 system, with the circumstellar habitable zone in green.

Observation data Epoch J2000 Equinox ICRS
- Constellation: Lyra
- Right ascension: 18^{h} 59^{m} 45.8408^{s}
- Declination: +46° 33′ 59.438″
- Apparent magnitude (V): 15.473

Characteristics
- Evolutionary stage: main sequence
- Spectral type: M0V

Astrometry
Proper motion (μ)	RA: 9.462(27) mas/yr Dec.: −13.942(26) mas/yr
Parallax (π)	2.9378±0.0211 mas
Distance	1,110 ± 8 ly (340 ± 2 pc)

Details
Mass	0.65 M_{☉}
Radius	0.59 R_{☉}
Luminosity	0.1 L_{☉}
Temperature	4500 K
Metallicity [Fe/H]	-0.21 dex
Rotation	17.918±0.005 days
Rotational velocity (v sin i)	1.9 km/s

Other designations
- KOI-250, KIC 9757613, 2MASS J18594583+4633595, Gaia DR2 2107317358665730688

Database references
SIMBAD	data
Exoplanet Archive	data
KIC	data

Kepler-26 is a star in the northern constellation of Lyra. It is located at the celestial coordinates: Right Ascension 18^{h} 59^{m} 45.8408^{s} Declination +46° 33′ 59.438″. With an apparent visual magnitude of 15.5, this star is too faint to be seen with the naked eye.

== Planetary system ==
The two planets, Kepler-26b and Kepler-26c, were discovered by transit method in late 2011, and classified as small (sub-Neptune) gas giants in 2016. In 2012, the planetary candidate Kepler-26d was also detected, and confirmed in 2014. The planet Kepler-26e was discovered on a much wider orbit in 2014.

The Kepler-26 planetary system
Companion (in order from star)	Mass	Semimajor axis (AU)	Orbital period (days)	Eccentricity	Inclination (°)	Radius
d	—	0.039	3.543919	—	—	1.2 R_{🜨}
b	5.1±0.7 M_{🜨}	0.085	12.2829	—	—	2.78±0.11 R_{🜨}
c	6.2±0.7 M_{🜨}	0.107	17.2513	—	—	2.72±0.12 R_{🜨}
e	—	0.22	46.827915	—	—	2.1 R_{🜨}
