= Kepler-24d =

Exoplanet

Discovery
- Discovered by: Jason F. Rowe et al.
- Discovery date: 26 February 2014
- Detection method: Transit method

Orbital characteristics
- Semi-major axis: 0.051 AU (7.6 million km)
- Orbital period (sidereal): 4.24437621(2426) d
- Star: Kepler-24

Physical characteristics
- Mean radius: 0.149 ± 0.035 R_{J}

Kepler-24d is a transiting exoplanet orbiting the star Kepler-24, located in the constellation Lyra. It was discovered by the Kepler telescope in February 2014. It orbits its parent star at only 0.051 astronomical units away, and at its distance it completes an orbit once every 4.244384 days.
