= HD 177808 =

Star in the constellation Lyra

Observation data Epoch J2000.0 Equinox ICRS
- Constellation: Lyra
- Right ascension: 19^{h} 04^{m} 57.87471^{s}
- Declination: +31° 44′ 38.6552″
- Apparent magnitude (V): 5.63

Characteristics
- Spectral type: M0III
- B−V color index: 1.548±0.003

Astrometry
Radial velocity (R_{v})	3.47±0.14 km/s
Proper motion (μ)	RA: +75.049 mas/yr Dec.: −76.913 mas/yr
Parallax (π)	5.8624±0.0556 mas
Distance	556 ± 5 ly (171 ± 2 pc)
Absolute magnitude (M_{V})	−0.75

Details
Mass	4.8 M_{☉}
Radius	48 R_{☉}
Luminosity	637 L_{☉}
Surface gravity (log g)	1.17 cgs
Temperature	4,452 K

Other designations
- BD+31°3453, GC 26266, HD 177808, HIP 93718, HR 7237, SAO 67782

Database references
SIMBAD	data

HD 177808 is a 6th magnitude star in the constellation Lyra, approximately 556 light years away from Earth. It is a solitary red giant star of the spectral type M0III, meaning it possesses a surface temperature of around 3,940 kelvins. It is therefore much larger and brighter than the Sun, yet cooler in comparison.
