= Kepler-88 =

Sun-like star in the constellation Lyra

Observation data Epoch J2000 Equinox ICRS
- Constellation: Lyra
- Right ascension: 19^{h} 24^{m} 35.54310^{s}
- Declination: +40° 40′ 09.8099″
- Apparent magnitude (V): 13.257

Characteristics
- Evolutionary stage: main sequence
- Spectral type: G6V

Astrometry
Radial velocity (R_{v})	−19.51±1.63 km/s
Proper motion (μ)	RA: 1.150(11) mas/yr Dec.: 4.956(15) mas/yr
Parallax (π)	2.6495±0.0109 mas
Distance	1,231 ± 5 ly (377 ± 2 pc)
Absolute magnitude (M_{V})	5.46±0.16

Details
Mass	0.990±0.023 M_{☉}
Radius	0.897±0.016 R_{☉}
Luminosity	0.598+0.079 −0.070 L_{☉}
Surface gravity (log g)	4.528+0.025 −0.019 cgs
Temperature	5466±60 K
Metallicity [Fe/H]	+0.27±0.06 dex
Rotation	30.689±0.383 days
Age	1.9±1.6 Gyr

Other designations
- Kepler-88, KOI-142, KIC 5446285, TIC 122712595, 2MASS J19243554+4040098

Database references
SIMBAD	data
Exoplanet Archive	data
KIC	data

Kepler-88 is a G-type star 1,230 light-years (380 parsecs) away in the constellation of Lyra, with three confirmed exoplanets. SIMBAD lists a subgiant spectral type of G8IV, while other sources give it a main sequence spectral type of G6V. The latter is more consistent with its properties (it is less luminous than the Sun).

== Planetary system ==
In April 2012, scientists discovered that a Kepler candidate known as KOI-142.01 (Kepler-88b) exhibited very significant transit-timing variations caused by a non-transiting planet. The timing variations were large enough to cause changes to the transit durations of Kepler-88b as well. Large transit-timing variations helped to put tight constraints on the masses of both planets. The non-transiting planet, Kepler-88c, was further confirmed through the radial velocity method in November 2013.

Kepler-88b is the innermost planet in the system and is Neptune-sized but almost half as massive. Kepler 88c is about 67% as massive as Jupiter, but its radius is not known due to not transiting the star.

Kepler-88d orbits its star every four years, and its orbit is not circular, but elliptical. At three times the mass of Jupiter, it is the most massive planet known in the system. It was discovered based on six years of radial velocity (RV) follow-up from the W. M. Keck Observatory HIRES spectrograph.

The Kepler-88 planetary system
Companion (in order from star)	Mass	Semimajor axis (AU)	Orbital period (days)	Eccentricity	Inclination (°)	Radius
b	9.5±1.1 M_{🜨}	0.098	10.91647±0.00014	0.05561±0.00013	90.97±0.12	3.438±0.075 R_{🜨}
c	0.674±0.016 M_{J}	0.15525	22.26492±0.00067	0.05724±0.00045	93.15±0.68	—
d	≥3.05±0.16 M_{J}	2.45±0.02	1403±14	0.41±0.03	—	—
