= Kepler-30 =

Yellow star in the constellation Lyra

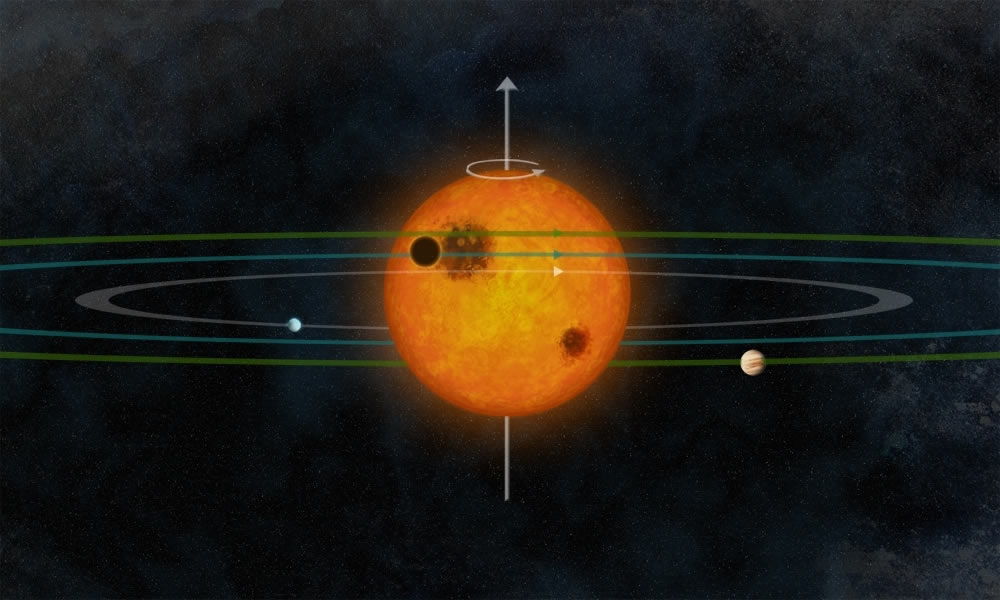
- An artist's interpretation of the Kepler-30 system.

Observation data Epoch J2000 Equinox ICRS
- Constellation: Lyra
- Right ascension: 19^{h} 01^{m} 08.0746^{s}
- Declination: +38° 56′ 50.218″
- Apparent magnitude (V): 15.5

Characteristics
- Evolutionary stage: main sequence
- Spectral type: G3V

Astrometry
Proper motion (μ)	RA: 0.743(29) mas/yr Dec.: −4.737(28) mas/yr
Parallax (π)	1.1113±0.0241 mas
Distance	2,930 ± 60 ly (900 ± 20 pc)

Details
Mass	0.99±0.08 M_{☉}
Radius	0.95 R_{☉}
Luminosity	0.58 L_{☉}
Surface gravity (log g)	4.53 cgs
Temperature	5,498±54 K
Metallicity [Fe/H]	0.18±0.27 dex
Rotation	16.004±0.017 days
Rotational velocity (v sin i)	1.94±0.22 km/s
Age	1.9 Gyr

Other designations
- KOI-806, KIC 3832474, UCAC2 45365178, 2MASS J19010807+3856502, SDSS J190108.07+385650.2

Database references
SIMBAD	data
Exoplanet Archive	data
KIC	data

Kepler-30 is a star in the northern constellation of Lyra. It is located at the celestial coordinates: Right Ascension 19^{h} 01^{m} 08.0746^{s} Declination +38° 56′ 50.218″. With an apparent visual magnitude of 15.5, this star is too faint to be seen with the naked eye. Kepler-30 is exhibiting a strong starspot activity.

== Planetary system ==
Three planets of Kepler-30 were detected by the transit method in 2011. The planets are strongly interacting each other, with transit times variability exceeding one hour for each consecutive orbit. Due to the irregularity of orbits, confirmation of the planetary system was delayed until 2012. The planetary periods are close to 1:2:5 orbital resonance but are not resonant, producing an extremely complex orbital dynamics.

The Kepler-30 planetary system
Companion (in order from star)	Mass	Semimajor axis (AU)	Orbital period (days)	Eccentricity	Inclination (°)	Radius
b	9.2±0.1 M_{🜨}	0.18479±0.000004	29.2187±0.0009	0.0770±0.0003	89.51±0.32	3.75±0.18 R_{🜨}
c	536±5 M_{🜨}	0.29977±0.000001	60.32503±0.00010	0.0115±0.0005	89.74±0.02	11.98±0.28 R_{🜨}
d	23.7±1.3 M_{🜨}	0.53178±0.00001	142.642±0.006	0.0272±0.0024	89.81±0.02	8.79±0.13 R_{🜨}
