= Kepler-26e =

Mini-Neptune orbiting Kepler-26

Discovery
- Discovered by: Jason F. Rowe et al.
- Discovery date: 26 February 2014
- Detection method: Transit method

Orbital characteristics
- Semi-major axis: 0.220 AU (32,900,000 km)
- Orbital period (sidereal): 46.827915 ± 0.000173 d
- Star: Kepler-26

Physical characteristics
- Mean radius: 2.1/2.41 R_{🜨}

Kepler-26e is an exoplanet orbiting the star Kepler-26, located in the constellation Lyra. It was discovered by the Kepler telescope in February 2014. It orbits its parent star at only 0.220 astronomical units and completes an orbit once every 46.8 days. It is located within the star's habitable zone. The Habitable Worlds Catalog issued by the Planetary Habitability Laboratory classes the planet as a warm superterran near the inner edge of the optimistic habitable zone, with an equilibrium temperature of 262 K (−11 °C; 12 °F). The planet is likely tidally locked due to its proximity to the star.
