= HD 172044 =

Star in the constellation Lyra

Observation data Epoch J2000.0 Equinox ICRS
- Constellation: Lyra
- Right ascension: 18^{h} 36^{m} 37.34437^{s}
- Declination: +33° 28′ 08.5352″
- Apparent magnitude (V): 5.41 + 10.7

Characteristics
- Spectral type: B8IIpHgMn
- U−B color index: −0.509
- B−V color index: −0.101±0.003

Astrometry

A
Radial velocity (R_{v})	−32.5±0.8 km/s
Proper motion (μ)	RA: −7.966 mas/yr Dec.: +0.690 mas/yr
Parallax (π)	6.0990±0.0893 mas
Distance	535 ± 8 ly (164 ± 2 pc)
Absolute magnitude (M_{V})	−0.53

B
Proper motion (μ)	RA: −7.403 mas/yr Dec.: +0.479 mas/yr
Parallax (π)	6.2391±0.0221 mas
Distance	523 ± 2 ly (160.3 ± 0.6 pc)

Orbit
Period (P)	1675 d
Semi-major axis (a)	≥71.6×10^{8} km
Eccentricity (e)	0.16
Periastron epoch (T)	2,420,438.5 JD
Argument of periastron (ω) (secondary)	120°
Semi-amplitude (K_{1}) (primary)	3.2 km/s

Details

A
Mass	3.65±0.50 M_{☉}
Luminosity	262.17 L_{☉}
Surface gravity (log g)	3.90 cgs
Temperature	14,500 K
Metallicity [Fe/H]	−0.25 dex
Rotational velocity (v sin i)	34 km/s

Other designations
- BD+33°3154, GC 25443, HD 172044, HIP 91235, HR 6997, SAO 67164, CCDM J18366+3328, WDS J18366+3328, GSC 02641-02396

Database references
SIMBAD	data

HD 172044 is a triple star system in the northern constellation of Lyra. It has a blue-white hue and is visible to the naked eye with an apparent visual magnitude of 5.41. The distance to the primary component is approximately 535 light years based on parallax. It is drifting closer with a radial velocity of −32.5 km/s, and is predicted to come as near as 77.3 light-years to the Sun some 4.5 million years from now.

The dual nature of the primary star, component A, was announced in 1973 by H. A. Abt and M. A. Snowden. It is a single-lined spectroscopic binary with a preliminary orbital period of 4.59 years and an eccentricity (ovalness) of 0.16. The visible component is a B-type bright giant with a stellar classification of B8IIpHgMn, where the suffix notation indicates it is a chemically peculiar mercury-manganese star. This means that the star has a overabundance of the elements mercury (Hg) and manganese (Mn).

Component B is a magnitude 9.40 companion of an unknown spectral type. It was first reported by F. G. W. Struve in 1830. As of 2016, it has an angular separation of 7.2 arcseconds along a position angle of 204° from the brighter component.
