= HD 173417 =

Star in the constellation Lyra

Observation data Epoch J2000.0 Equinox J2000.0
- Constellation: Lyra
- Right ascension: 18^{h} 43^{m} 51.59217^{s}
- Declination: +31° 55′ 35.8058″
- Apparent magnitude (V): 5.68

Characteristics
- Spectral type: F1III-IV
- B−V color index: +0.360±0.004
- Variable type: Constant

Astrometry
Radial velocity (R_{v})	−3.26±0.57 km/s
Proper motion (μ)	RA: −32.768 mas/yr Dec.: −125.812 mas/yr
Parallax (π)	19.27±0.60 mas
Distance	169 ± 5 ly (52 ± 2 pc)
Absolute magnitude (M_{V})	2.17

Details
Mass	1.60 M_{☉}
Radius	2.243 R_{☉}
Luminosity	10.407 L_{☉}
Surface gravity (log g)	3.91 cgs
Temperature	6,928 K
Metallicity [Fe/H]	−0.21 dex
Rotational velocity (v sin i)	53.9±2.7 km/s
Age	1.70 Gyr

Other designations
- BD+31°3348, GC 25643, HD 173417, HIP 91883, HR 7044, SAO 67293, GSC 02641-02397

Database references
SIMBAD	data

HD 173417 is a single star in the northern constellation of Lyra. It is dimly visible to the naked eye with an apparent visual magnitude of 5.68, positioned about two degrees to the southwest of the bright star Sheliak. The distance to this star is approximately 169 light years based on parallax measurements, and it is slowly drifting closer with a radial velocity of −3 km/s.

The stellar classification of this star is F1III-IV, matching an evolving star with the mixed luminosity traits of a subgiant and giant star. It is 1.7 billion years old with a low metallicity and a relatively high projected rotational velocity of 54 km/s. The star has 1.6 times the mass of the Sun and 2.2 times the Sun's radius. It is radiating over 10 times the luminosity of the Sun from its photosphere at an effective temperature of 6,928 K.
