= Kepler-65 =

F-type subgiant star in the constellation Lyra

Observation data Epoch J2000 Equinox ICRS
- Constellation: Lyra
- Right ascension: 19^{h} 14^{m} 45.2916^{s}
- Declination: +41° 09′ 04.210″
- Apparent magnitude (V): 11.018

Characteristics
- Evolutionary stage: main sequence
- Spectral type: F6IV

Astrometry
Proper motion (μ)	RA: 1.256(14) mas/yr Dec.: −14.388(12) mas/yr
Parallax (π)	3.3184±0.0108 mas
Distance	983 ± 3 ly (301.4 ± 1.0 pc)

Details
Mass	1.25 M_{☉}
Radius	1.41 R_{☉}
Temperature	6211 K
Metallicity [Fe/H]	+0.17 dex
Rotation	7.911±0.155 days

Other designations
- KOI-85, KIC 5866724, TYC 3125-976-1, GSC 03125-00976, 2MASS J19144528+4109042

Database references
SIMBAD	data
Exoplanet Archive	data
KIC	data

Kepler-65 is a subgiant star slightly more massive than the Sun and has at least four planets.

== Planetary system ==
Three transiting planets were announced in 2013. A fourth non-transiting planet was discovered using radial velocity measurements in 2019. The first three planets orbit very close to their star. Initial follow-up radial velocity measurements provided data too noisy to constrain the mass of planets. Follow-up transit-timing variation analysis helped to measure the mass of Kepler-65d which revealed that it has significantly lower density than Earth.

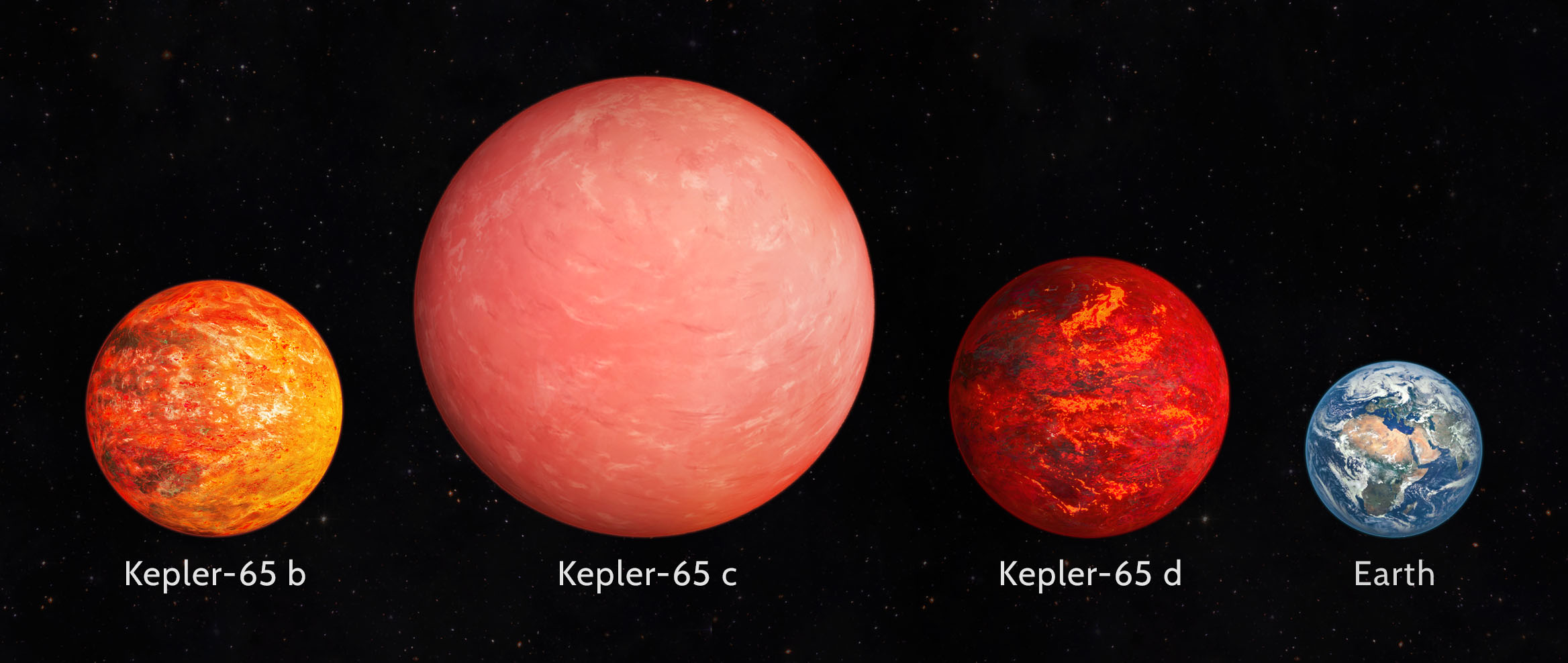
Size comparison of the three planets of Kepler 65 with a known radius (artistic concept) with Earth

The Kepler-65 planetary system
Companion (in order from star)	Mass	Semimajor axis (AU)	Orbital period (days)	Eccentricity	Inclination (°)	Radius
b	2.4+2.4 −1.6 M_{🜨}	0.035	2.1549209+0.0000086 −0.0000074	0.028+0.031 −0.02	92.2+1.3 −1.4	1.444+0.037 −0.031 R_{🜨}
c	5.4±1.7 M_{🜨}	0.068	5.859697+0.000093 −0.000099	0.02+0.022 −0.013	92.33+0.29 −0.26	2.623+0.066 −0.056 R_{🜨}
d	4.14+0.79 −0.80 M_{🜨}	0.084	8.13167+0.00024 −0.00021	0.014+0.016 −0.010	92.35+0.18 −0.16	1.587+0.040 −0.035 R_{🜨}
e	200+200 −50 M_{🜨}	—	258.8+1.5 −1.3	0.283+0.064 −0.071	127.0+27.0 −25.0	—
