= HD 174179 =

Star in the constellation Lyra

Observation data Epoch J2000.0 Equinox J2000.0
- Constellation: Lyra
- Right ascension: 18^{h} 46^{m} 13.01070^{s}
- Declination: +41° 26′ 30.5041″
- Apparent magnitude (V): 6.06

Characteristics
- Spectral type: B3IVp
- B−V color index: −0.139±0.003

Astrometry
Radial velocity (R_{v})	−15.0±2.9 km/s
Proper motion (μ)	RA: +1.093 mas/yr Dec.: −3.957 mas/yr
Parallax (π)	2.5407±0.0769 mas
Distance	1,280 ± 40 ly (390 ± 10 pc)
Absolute magnitude (M_{V})	−1.57

Details
Mass	6.6±0.1 M_{☉}
Luminosity (bolometric)	2,036 L_{☉}
Temperature	17,900 K
Rotational velocity (v sin i)	5 km/s
Age	32.8±5.0 Myr

Other designations
- BD+31°3369, FK5 3493, GC 25768, HD 174179, HIP 92243, HR 7081, SAO 67396

Database references
SIMBAD	data

HD 174179 is a single star in the northern constellation of Lyra. It has a white hue and is dimly visible to the naked eye with an apparent visual magnitude of 6.06. The star is located at a distance of approximately 1,280 light years from the Sun based on parallax, but is drifting closer with a radial velocity of −15 km/s.

The star is an estimated 33 million years old with a low projected rotational velocity of 5 km/s. It has 6.6 times the mass of the Sun and is radiating 2,036 times the Sun's luminosity from its photosphere at an effective temperature of 17,900 K.

HD 174179 is a Be star, showing Balmer emission lines in its spectrum at times. It has a stellar classification of B3IVp, with 'p' indicating spectral features of a shell star. A 1976 study found no emission features, but the star was reported to show emission lines again in later studies.
