= HD 175443 =

Single star in the constellation Lyra

Observation data Epoch J2000.0 Equinox ICRS
- Constellation: Lyra
- Right ascension: 18^{h} 54^{m} 13.24716^{s}
- Declination: +27° 54′ 34.2928″
- Apparent magnitude (V): 5.64

Characteristics
- Spectral type: K4III
- B−V color index: 1.361±0.003

Astrometry
Radial velocity (R_{v})	+13.3±0.3 km/s
Proper motion (μ)	RA: −7.526 mas/yr Dec.: −71.496 mas/yr
Parallax (π)	7.8072±0.0781 mas
Distance	418 ± 4 ly (128 ± 1 pc)
Absolute magnitude (M_{V})	0.42

Details
Radius	22.08+1.01 −1.25 R_{☉}
Luminosity	150.7±1.9 L_{☉}
Surface gravity (log g)	1.84 cgs
Temperature	4,304+128 −94 K
Metallicity [Fe/H]	−0.19 dex
Rotational velocity (v sin i)	1.0 km/s

Other designations
- BD+27°3150, GC 25942, HD 175443, HIP 92768, HR 7132, SAO 86558

Database references
SIMBAD	data

HD 175443 is a single star in the northern constellation of Lyra. This object has an orange hue and is dimly visible to the naked eye with an apparent visual magnitude of 5.64. It is located at a distance of approximately 418 light years based on parallax, and has an absolute magnitude of 0.42. The star is drifting further away with a radial velocity of +13 km/s.

This is an aging giant star with a stellar classification of K4III, having exhausted the supply of hydrogen at its core then cooled and expanded off the main sequence. It now has 22 times the girth of the Sun and is radiating 151 times the luminosity of the Sun at an effective temperature of 4,304 K. The metallicity, or abundance of elements with higher atomic numbers than helium, is lower than in the Sun, and it is spinning slowly with a projected rotational velocity of 1.0 km/s.
