= Kepler-24c =

Exoplanet

Discovery
- Discovered by: Eric B. Ford et al.
- Discovery date: 25 January 2012
- Detection method: Transit method

Orbital characteristics
- Semi-major axis: 0.106 AU (15.9 million km)
- Orbital period (sidereal): 12.33340885(6674) d
- Star: Kepler-24

Physical characteristics
- Mean radius: 2.36+0.87 −0.35 R_{🜨}
- Mass: 33.6+13.0 −9.5 M_{🜨}

Kepler-24c is an exoplanet orbiting the star Kepler-24, located in the constellation Lyra. It was discovered by the Kepler telescope in January 2012. It orbits its parent star at only 0.106 astronomical units away, and at its distance it completes an orbit once every 12.3335 days.
