= HD 173936 =

Star in the constellation Lyra

Observation data Epoch J2000.0 Equinox ICRS
- Constellation: Lyra
- Right ascension: 18^{h} 46^{m} 13.01070^{s}
- Declination: +41° 26′ 30.5041″
- Apparent magnitude (V): 6.06

Characteristics
- Evolutionary stage: Main sequence
- Spectral type: B6 V
- B−V color index: −0.120±0.005

Astrometry
| Radial velocity (R_{v}) | −19.1±2.9 km/s |
| Proper motion (μ) | RA: −1.441 mas/yr Dec.: +0.858 mas/yr |
| Parallax (π) | 3.6200±0.0622 mas |
| Distance | 900 ± 20 ly (276 ± 5 pc) |
| Absolute magnitude (M_{V}) | −1.14 |

Details
| Mass | 4.59±0.23 M_{☉} |
| Luminosity | 701+194 −151 L_{☉} |
| Surface gravity (log g) | 3.81±0.08 cgs |
| Temperature | 13,932±96 K |
| Metallicity [Fe/H] | −0.04±0.08 dex |
| Rotational velocity (v sin i) | 116±8 km/s |
| Age | 22.4 Gyr |

Other designations
- BD+41°3137, FK5 3493, GC 25732, HD 173936, HIP 92098, HR 7073, SAO 47779

Database references
| SIMBAD | data |

HD 173936 is a star in the northern constellation of Lyra. It has a blue-white hue and is just barely visible to the naked eye with an apparent visual magnitude of 6.06. Based upon parallax measurements, the star is located at a distance of approximately 900 light years from the Sun, and has an absolute magnitude of −1.14. It is drifting closer with a radial velocity of −19 km/s.

This object is a B-type main-sequence star with a stellar classification of B6 V. It is around 22.4 million years old with 4.6 times the mass of the Sun and has a high rate of spin, showing a projected rotational velocity of 116 km/s. It is radiating 701 times the luminosity of the Sun from its photosphere at an effective temperature of 13,932 K.
