= HD 178233 =

Star in the constellation Lyra

Observation data Epoch J2000.0 Equinox J2000.0
- Constellation: Lyra
- Right ascension: 19^{h} 06^{m} 37.7345^{s}
- Declination: +28° 37′ 42.941″
- Apparent magnitude (V): 5.53

Characteristics
- Spectral type: F0III or A7V
- U−B color index: +0.04
- B−V color index: 0.296±0.003

Astrometry
Radial velocity (R_{v})	−24.0±4.3 km/s
Proper motion (μ)	RA: 75.662 mas/yr Dec.: 85.291 mas/yr
Parallax (π)	24.3974±0.0867 mas
Distance	133.7 ± 0.5 ly (41.0 ± 0.1 pc)
Absolute magnitude (M_{V})	2.52

Details
Mass	1.54 M_{☉}
Radius	1.83+0.10 −0.06 R_{☉}
Luminosity	8.233±0.038 L_{☉}
Surface gravity (log g)	4.21±0.14 cgs
Temperature	7,220+126 −175 K
Metallicity [Fe/H]	0.04 dex
Age	498 Myr

Other designations
- BD+28°3193, GC 26317, HD 178233, HIP 93843, HR 7253, SAO 86819

Database references
SIMBAD	data

HD 178233 is a single star in the northern constellation of Lyra. It is bright enough to be dimly visible to the naked eye with an apparent visual magnitude of 5.53, making it a sixth magnitude star. The distance to HD 178233 is 134 light years based on parallax measurements, but it is drifting closer to the Sun with a radial velocity of approximately −24 km/s.

The stellar classification of this star was determined to be F0III by A. Cowley and associates (1969), matching an evolved F-type giant star. In contrast, D. R. Palmer and associates (1968) listed it as an A-type main-sequence star with a class of A7V. It is about a half billion years old and is spinning rapidly with a projected rotational velocity of 165.0 km/s, which is giving the star an equatorial bulge that is ~24% wider than the polar radius. The star has 1.5 times the mass and 1.8 times the mean radius of the Sun. It is radiating over eight times the luminosity of the Sun from its photosphere at an effective temperature of 7,220 K.
