= HD 180450 =

Star in the constellation Lyra

Observation data Epoch J2000.0 Equinox ICRS
- Constellation: Lyra
- Right ascension: 19^{h} 15^{m} 24.859^{s}
- Declination: +30° 31′ 34.98″
- Apparent magnitude (V): 5.88

Characteristics
- Evolutionary stage: AGB
- Spectral type: M1IIIab
- U−B color index: +2.03
- B−V color index: +1.665±0.007

Astrometry
Radial velocity (R_{v})	−64.43±0.23 km/s
Proper motion (μ)	RA: 34.374 mas/yr Dec.: −26.212 mas/yr
Parallax (π)	3.4206±0.0625 mas
Distance	950 ± 20 ly (292 ± 5 pc)
Absolute magnitude (M_{V})	−2.03

Details
Mass	1.4 M_{☉}
Radius	84 R_{☉}
Luminosity	1,218 L_{☉}
Surface gravity (log g)	1.58 cgs
Temperature	3,733 K
Metallicity [Fe/H]	−0.23 dex

Other designations
- BD+30°3491, GC 26550, HD 180450, HIP 94630, HR 7302, SAO 68040, GSC 02653-01682

Database references
SIMBAD	data

HD 180450 is a single star in the northern constellation of Lyra, positioned about half a degree to the NNW of the globular cluster M56. At an apparent visual magnitude of 5.88, it is dimly visible to the naked eye under good viewing conditions. This star is located at a distance of approximately 950 light years from the Sun based on parallax measurements, but is drifting closer with a radial velocity of −64.4 km/s.

This is an aging red giant star with a stellar classification of M1IIIab. It is currently on the asymptotic giant branch, having exhausted the supply of hydrogen in its core and evolved off the main sequence. The star has expanded to ~68 times the radius of the Sun and is radiating a thousand times the Sun's luminosity from its enlarged photosphere at an effective temperature of 3,947 K.
