= HD 177809 =

Red giant star in the constellation Lyra

Observation data Epoch J2000.0 Equinox ICRS
- Constellation: Lyra
- Right ascension: 19^{h} 04^{m} 58.2870^{s}
- Declination: +30° 44′ 00.257″
- Apparent magnitude (V): 6.07

Characteristics
- Evolutionary stage: AGB
- Spectral type: M3- IIIab
- B−V color index: +1.575

Astrometry
Radial velocity (R_{v})	−19.35 km/s
Proper motion (μ)	RA: +31.265 mas/yr Dec.: −25.486 mas/yr
Parallax (π)	4.9114±0.0698 mas
Distance	664 ± 9 ly (204 ± 3 pc)
Absolute magnitude (M_{V})	−0.39

Details
Mass	1.3 M_{☉}
Radius	50 R_{☉}
Luminosity	477 L_{☉}
Surface gravity (log g)	1.81 cgs
Temperature	3,798 K
Metallicity [Fe/H]	−0.22 dex

Other designations
- BD+30°3409, GC 26264, HD 177809, HIP 93720, HR 7238, SAO 67781

Database references
SIMBAD	data

HD 177809 is a 6th magnitude star in the constellation Lyra, approximately 664 light years away from Earth. It is a red giant star of the spectral type M3- IIIab<, meaning it possesses a surface temperature of under 4,000 K. In comparison to the Sun, it is much larger and brighter, but its surface is cooler.
