= HD 171301 =

Star in the constellation Lyra

Observation data Epoch J2000.0 Equinox ICRS
- Constellation: Lyra
- Right ascension: 18^{h} 32^{m} 49.95782^{s}
- Declination: +30° 33′ 15.1485″
- Apparent magnitude (V): 5.47 + 12.7

Characteristics
- Spectral type: B8IV or B8V
- U−B color index: −0.463
- B−V color index: −0.077±0.003

Astrometry
Radial velocity (R_{v})	−10.3±1.5 km/s
Proper motion (μ)	RA: 13.229 mas/yr Dec.: 11.581 mas/yr
Parallax (π)	9.3894±0.1103 mas
Distance	347 ± 4 ly (107 ± 1 pc)
Absolute magnitude (M_{V})	0.27

Details

A
Mass	3.12±0.03 M_{☉}
Radius	2.7±0.1 R_{☉}
Luminosity	123.8+7.7 −7.1 L_{☉}
Temperature	11,695±81 K
Metallicity [Fe/H]	+0.08±0.07 dex
Rotational velocity (v sin i)	36±2 km/s

Other designations
- BD+30°3223, GC 25340, HD 171301, HIP 90923, HR 6968, SAO 67090, CCDM J18328+3033, GSC 02624-02539

Database references
SIMBAD	data

HD 171301 is a suspected binary star system in the northern constellation of Lyra. It has not been well-studied. The brighter member of the pair, designated component A, has a blue-white hue and is visible to the naked eye with an apparent visual magnitude of 5.47. The system is located at a distance of approximately 347 light years from the Sun based on parallax, but is drifting closer with a radial velocity of −10 km/s.

The stellar classification of HD 171301 is B8IV, matching a late B-type star that may be a subgiant that is evolving off the main sequence. HD 171301 appears to be a type of chemically peculiar mercury-manganese star. It has an estimated mass three times that of the Sun and 2.7 times the Sun's radius. The star is spinning with a projected rotational velocity of 36 km/s. It is radiating 124 times the luminosity of the Sun from its photosphere at an effective temperature of 11,695 K.

Its companion, component B, is a 13th magnitude star of an unknown spectral type. It was first reported by S. W. Burnham in 1891. As of 1998, it was located at an angular separation of 6.7 arcseconds from the brighter star along a position angle of 157°.
