= Kepler-43 =

G-type star in the constellation Lyra

Observation data Epoch J2000 Equinox ICRS
- Constellation: Lyra
- Right ascension: 19^{h} 00^{m} 57.8034^{s}
- Declination: +46° 40′ 05.666″
- Apparent magnitude (V): 14.08

Characteristics
- Evolutionary stage: subgiant
- Spectral type: G0V~G0IV

Astrometry
Proper motion (μ)	RA: −2.982(14) mas/yr Dec.: 0.126(14) mas/yr
Parallax (π)	0.9846±0.0116 mas
Distance	3,310 ± 40 ly (1,020 ± 10 pc)

Details
Mass	1.32±0.09 M_{☉}
Radius	1.42±0.07 R_{☉}
Luminosity	1.95 L_{☉}
Surface gravity (log g)	4.26±0.05 cgs
Temperature	6,041±123 K
Metallicity [Fe/H]	0.33±0.11 dex
Rotation	12.851±0.053 days
Rotational velocity (v sin i)	5.5±1.5 km/s
Age	2.8+1.0 −0.8 Gyr

Other designations
- Kepler-43, KOI-135, KIC 9818381

Database references
SIMBAD	data
Exoplanet Archive	data
KIC	data

Kepler-43, formerly known as KOI-135, is a star in the northern constellation of Lyra. At 14th magnitude, it is too faint to be seen with the naked eye.

Kepler-43 has a very strong starspot activity.

== Planetary system ==
The Kepler spacecraft detected a transiting planet candidate around this star that was confirmed by radial velocity measurements taken by the SOPHIE spectrograph mounted on the 1.93 m telescope at the Haute-Provence Observatory.

The planet nightside temperature was measured to be 2,043+79
−352 K.

The Kepler-43 planetary system
Companion (in order from star)	Mass	Semimajor axis (AU)	Orbital period (days)	Eccentricity	Inclination (°)	Radius
b	3.23±0.19 M_{J}	0.0449	3.0240949±0.0000006	—	—	—
