= HD 176871 =

Star in the constellation Lyra

Observation data Epoch J2000.0 Equinox ICRS
- Constellation: Lyra
- Right ascension: 19^{h} 01^{m} 17.35683^{s}
- Declination: +26° 17′ 29.0764″
- Apparent magnitude (V): 5.69

Characteristics
- Spectral type: B5V
- U−B color index: −0.55
- B−V color index: −0.086±0.002

Astrometry
Radial velocity (R_{v})	−20.4±1.2 km/s
Proper motion (μ)	RA: −0.489 mas/yr Dec.: −9.207 mas/yr
Parallax (π)	4.1038±0.0835 mas
Distance	790 ± 20 ly (244 ± 5 pc)
Absolute magnitude (M_{V})	−0.80

Details
Mass	4.1 M_{☉}
Radius	5.2 R_{☉}
Luminosity	394 L_{☉}
Surface gravity (log g)	4.5 cgs
Temperature	11,688 K
Rotational velocity (v sin i)	268±34 km/s
Age	11 Myr

Other designations
- BD+26°3429, FK5 3518, GC 26151, HD 176871, HIP 93393, HR 7202, SAO 86707

Database references
SIMBAD	data

HD 176871 is a single star in the northern constellation of Lyra, positioned near the southern constellation border with Vulpecula. This object has a blue-white hue and is dimly visible to the naked eye with an apparent visual magnitude of 5.69. It is located at a distance of approximately 790 light years from the Sun based on parallax, and has an absolute magnitude of −0.80. The star is drifting closer with a radial velocity of −20 km/s.

This is a normal B-type main-sequence star with a stellar classification of B5V, which means it is generating energy via core hydrogen fusion. The star is around 11 million years old with 5.4 times the mass of the Sun and is spinning rapidly with a projected rotational velocity of 268 km/s. It is radiating 233 times the luminosity of the Sun from its photosphere at an effective temperature of 10,540 K.
