= HD 176527 =

Single star in the constellation Lyra

Observation data Epoch J2000.0 Equinox ICRS
- Constellation: Lyra
- Right ascension: 18^{h} 59^{m} 45.48423^{s}
- Declination: +26° 13′ 49.4593″
- Apparent magnitude (V): 5.26

Characteristics
- Evolutionary stage: red giant branch
- Spectral type: K2III
- B−V color index: 1.228±0.003

Astrometry
Radial velocity (R_{v})	−22.56±0.13 km/s
Proper motion (μ)	RA: −85.738 mas/yr Dec.: −11.304 mas/yr
Parallax (π)	9.3474±0.0542 mas
Distance	349 ± 2 ly (107.0 ± 0.6 pc)
Absolute magnitude (M_{V})	0.28

Details
Mass	3.3 M_{☉}
Radius	24 R_{☉}
Luminosity	170 L_{☉}
Surface gravity (log g)	2.09 cgs
Temperature	4.297 K
Metallicity [Fe/H]	−0.28 dex
Age	292 Myr

Other designations
- BD+26°3418, GC 26101, HD 176527, HIP 93256, HR 7181, SAO 86673

Database references
SIMBAD	data

HD 176527 is a single star in the northern constellation of Lyra, positioned near the southern constellation border with Vulpecula. It has an orange hue and is dimly visible to the naked eye with an apparent visual magnitude of 5.26. This object is located at a distance of approximately 349 light years from the Sun based on parallax, and it has an absolute magnitude of 0.28. It is drifting closer with a radial velocity of −22.6 km/s.

This is an aging giant star with a stellar classification of K2III, which indicates it has exhausted the supply of hydrogen at its core, then evolved away from the main sequence by cooling and expanding. At present it has 24 times the radius of the Sun. The star is radiating 170 times the luminosity of the Sun from its swollen photosphere at an effective temperature of 4,297 K.
