= HD 167965 =

Star in the constellation Lyra

Observation data Epoch J2000.0 Equinox ICRS
- Constellation: Lyra
- Right ascension: 18^{h} 15^{m} 38.77722^{s}
- Declination: +42° 09′ 33.6439″
- Apparent magnitude (V): 5.56

Characteristics
- Spectral type: B7IV or B8V
- U−B color index: −0.469
- B−V color index: −0.111±0.001

Astrometry
Radial velocity (R_{v})	−20.5±0.9 km/s
Proper motion (μ)	RA: −2.618 mas/yr Dec.: +0.815 mas/yr
Parallax (π)	5.5547±0.1389 mas
Distance	590 ± 10 ly (180 ± 5 pc)
Absolute magnitude (M_{V})	−0.73

Details
Mass	4.00±0.01 M_{☉} 4.498±0.225 M_{☉}
Radius	3.2 R_{☉} 4.006±0.200 R_{☉}
Luminosity	337.52 L_{☉}
Luminosity (bolometric)	381 L_{☉}
Temperature	13,100 K
Rotational velocity (v sin i)	187±14 km/s 201 km/s

Other designations
- BD+42°3035, FK5 684, GC 24936, HD 167965, HIP 89482, HR 6845, SAO 47342

Database references
SIMBAD	data

HD 167965 is a single star in the northern constellation of Lyra. It is dimly visible to the naked eye on a sufficiently dark night, having an apparent visual magnitude of 5.56. The star is located at a distance of approximately 590 light years from the Sun based on parallax. It is drifting closer with a radial velocity of −20.5 km/s and is predicted to come as near as 72.7 light-years in around 8.5 million years.

The stellar classification of HD 167965 is B7IV, matching a late B-type star that may have left the main sequence. It is spinning rapidly with a projected rotational velocity of 187 km/s. The star has four times the mass and radius of the Sun, and is radiating 381 times the luminosity of the Sun from its photosphere at an effective temperature of 13,100 K.

In 1925, Otto Struve included this star in a list of newly discovered spectroscopic binaries, although that is no longer held to be the case.
