= Kepler-24b =

Exoplanet

Discovery
- Discovered by: Eric B. Ford et al.
- Discovery date: 25 January 2012
- Detection method: Transit method

Orbital characteristics
- Semi-major axis: 0.080 AU (12.0 million km)
- Orbital period (sidereal): 8.14511872(4028) d
- Star: Kepler-24

Physical characteristics
- Mean radius: 2.02+0.75 −0.30 R_{🜨}
- Mass: 33.3+10.8 −8.1 M_{🜨}

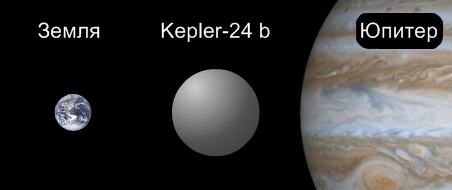
Relative sizes of Earth, Kepler-24b and Jupiter

Kepler-24b is an exoplanet orbiting the star Kepler-24, located in the constellation Lyra. It was discovered by the Kepler telescope in January 2012. It orbits its parent star at only 0.08 astronomical units away, and at its distance it completes an orbit once every 8.145 days.
