= Kepler-93b =

Super-Earth exoplanet in constellation Lyra

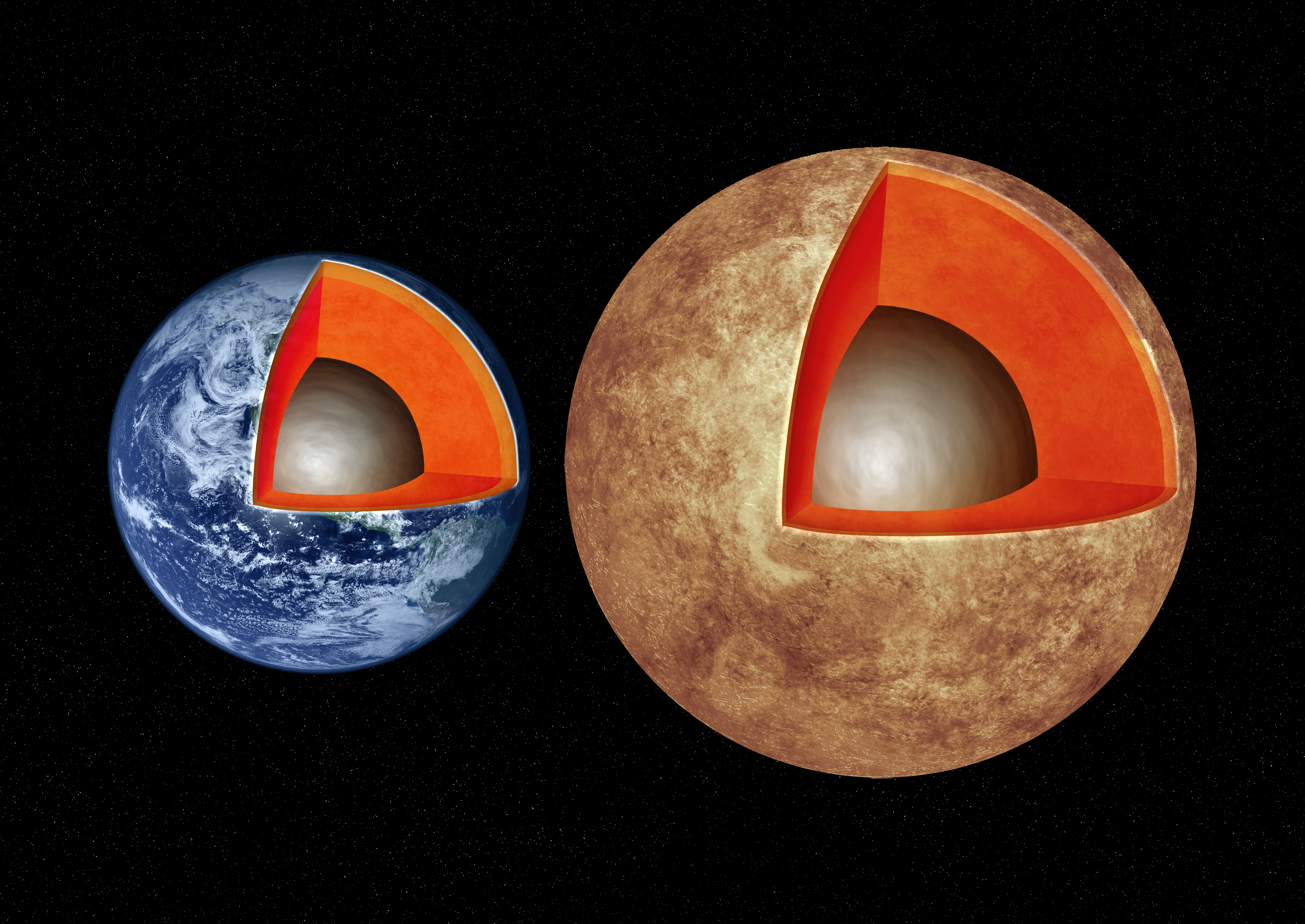
- An artist's impression comparing the size and internal structure of Earth (left) and Kepler-93b (right).

Discovery
- Discovered by: Geoffrey W. Marcy et al.
- Discovery date: February 2014 (announced)
- Detection method: Transit method

Designations
- Alternative names: KIC 3544595 b, KOI-69.01, BD+38 3583b, TYC 3134-218-1 b

Orbital characteristics
- Semi-major axis: 0.05343±0.00065 AU
- Eccentricity: 0
- Orbital period (sidereal): 4.72673978(97) d
- Inclination: 89.183°±0.044°
- Semi-amplitude: 1.89±0.21 m/s
- Star: Kepler-93

Physical characteristics
- Mean radius: 1.478±0.019 R_{🜨}
- Mass: 4.66±0.53 M_{🜨}
- Mean density: 7.93+0.96 −0.94 g/cm^{3}
- Temperature: 1133±17 K (860 °C; 1,580 °F, equilibrium)

Kepler-93b (KOI-69b) is a hot, dense transiting Super-Earth exoplanet located approximately 313 light-years (96 parsecs) away in the constellation of Lyra, orbiting the G-type star Kepler-93. Its discovery was announced in February 2014 by American astronomer Geoffrey Marcy and his team. In July 2014, its radius was determined with a mere 1.3% margin of error, the most precise measurement ever made for an exoplanet's radius at the time.

== Physical properties ==
The planet has a radius of around 1.478 R_{🜨} (9,416 km), with an uncertainty of just 0.019 R_{🜨} (121 km), making it the most precisely measured exoplanet ever in terms of radius as of July 2014. The planet is substantially denser than Earth at 6.88±1.18 g/cm^{3} thanks to its high mass of roughly 4 M_{🜨}, consistent with a rocky composition of iron and magnesium silicate. In 2023, the planet's mass was revised upward to 4.66±0.53 M_{🜨}, placing its density at 7.93^{+0.96}_{−0.94} g/cm^{3}, roughly the same as the metal iron (7.874 g/cm^{3}).

Based on these findings, the interior of the planet is likely similar to that of Earth and Venus, with an iron core making up around 26% of its total mass (albeit with a large uncertainty of ±20%), compared to the 32.5 ± 0.1% of Earth and 31 ± 1% of Venus.

The planet orbits its host star every 4.73 days at a distance of 0.05343 AU (7,993,000 km), less than one-seventh the radius of Mercury's orbit. Its equilibrium temperature is approximately 1,133 K (860 °C; 1,580 °F), which is as hot as lava and well above the melting point of aluminium. (Note: The temperature of lava is typically at 800–1,200 °C (1,070–1,470 K; 1,470–2,190 °F); aluminium melts at 660.32 °C (933.47 K; 1,220.58 °F).)

== Host star ==
The planet orbits a Sun-like (spectral type G5V) star named Kepler-93. The star has a mass of 0.911 M_{☉} and a radius of 0.919 R_{☉}. It has a temperature of 5,669 K (5,396 °C; 9,745 °F) and is 6.6 billion years old. In comparison, the Sun is 4.6 billion years old, has a temperature of 5,772 K (5,499 °C; 9,930 °F) and a spectral type of G2V. The apparent magnitude of the star is 9.931, making it too dim to be visible from Earth by the naked eye.

The star is host to an additional non-transiting confirmed companion, Kepler-93c, which was discovered using the radial-velocity method and announced in 2014, concurrently with Kepler-93b. The object is most likely a brown dwarf orbiting much farther out than Kepler-93b, though its precise nature remains uncertain. The discovery paper reported a lower limit on the mass of 3 M_{J} and a minimal orbital period of 1,460 days (4.0 years), while a subsequent study in 2015 weighed the planet at >8.5 M_{J} and presented an orbital period of >10 years, placing its orbit beyond 4.5 AU from the star, and a 2023 study increased these lower limits further, to a mass >21 M_{J}, an orbital period >48.6 years, and a semi-major axis >13 AU.

== See also ==
- List of exoplanets discovered by the Kepler space telescope
- List of transiting exoplanets
- Other dense super-Earths orbiting close to their parent stars:
  - CoRoT-7b, has a similar radius to Kepler-93b, but is more massive and much hotter.
  - HD 219134 b, has a similar radius, mass and temperature.
  - Kepler-10b, has a similar radius, but is slightly less massive and much hotter.
  - Kepler-36b, has a similar radius, mass and temperature.
