= Kepler-102 =

Star in the constellation Lyra

Observation data Epoch J2000 Equinox ICRS
- Constellation: Lyra
- Right ascension: 18^{h} 45^{m} 55.85599^{s}
- Declination: +47° 12′ 28.8453″
- Apparent magnitude (V): 12.07

Characteristics
- Evolutionary stage: main sequence
- Spectral type: K3V

Astrometry
| Radial velocity (R_{v}) | −28.51±0.37 km/s |
| Proper motion (μ) | RA: −41.044 mas/yr Dec.: −43.267 mas/yr |
| Parallax (π) | 9.2517±0.0102 mas |
| Distance | 352.5 ± 0.4 ly (108.1 ± 0.1 pc) |

Details
| Mass | 0.803±0.021 M_{☉} |
| Radius | 0.724±0.018 R_{☉} |
| Temperature | 4909±98 K |
| Metallicity [Fe/H] | 0.11±0.04 dex |
| Rotation | 26.572±0.153 d |
| Age | 1.1+3.6 −0.5 Gyr |

Other designations
- KOI-82, KIC 10187017, TYC 3544-1383-1, 2MASS J18455585+4712289, Gaia DR2 2119583201145735808

Database references
| SIMBAD | data |
| Exoplanet Archive | data |

Kepler-102 is a star 353 light-years (108 parsecs) away in the constellation of Lyra. Kepler-102 is less luminous than the Sun. The star system does not contain any observable amount of dust. Kepler-102 is suspected to be orbited by a binary consisting of two red dwarf stars, at projected separations of 591 and 627 AU.

== Planetary system ==
In January 2014, a system of five planets around the star was announced, three of them being smaller than Earth. While 3 of the transit signals were discovered during the first year of the Kepler mission, their small size made them hard to confirm as possibilities of these being false positives were needed to be removed. Later, two other signals were detected. Follow-up radial velocity data helped to determine the mass of the two largest planets (Kepler-102d and Kepler-102e).

By 2017, the search for additional planets utilizing the transit-timing variation method had yielded zero results, although the presence of planets with semimajor axis beyond 10 AU cannot be excluded.

The Kepler-102 planetary system
| Companion (in order from star) | Mass | Semimajor axis (AU) | Orbital period (days) | Eccentricity | Inclination (°) | Radius |
|---|---|---|---|---|---|---|
| b | <1.1 M_{🜨} | 0.05521±0.00049 | 5.286965(12) | <0.100 | 89.78±0.22 | 0.460±0.026 R_{🜨} |
| c | <1.7 M_{🜨} | 0.06702±0.00059 | 7.071392(22) | <0.094 | 89.82±0.15 | 0.567±0.028 R_{🜨} |
| d | 3.0±1.3 M_{🜨} | 0.08618±0.00076 | 10.3117670(41) | <0.092 | 89.49±0.11 | 1.154±0.058 R_{🜨} |
| e | 4.7±1.8 M_{🜨} | 0.1162±0.0010 | 16.1456994(22) | <0.089 | 89.488±0.051 | 2.17±0.11 R_{🜨} |
| f | <4.3 M_{🜨} | 0.1656±0.0015 | 27.453592(60) | <0.10 | 89.320±0.037 | 0.861±0.022 R_{🜨} |

== See also ==
- 55 Cancri
- Kepler-37
- Kepler-20
- Kepler-33
