= Kepler-138 =

Red dwarf in the constellation Lyra

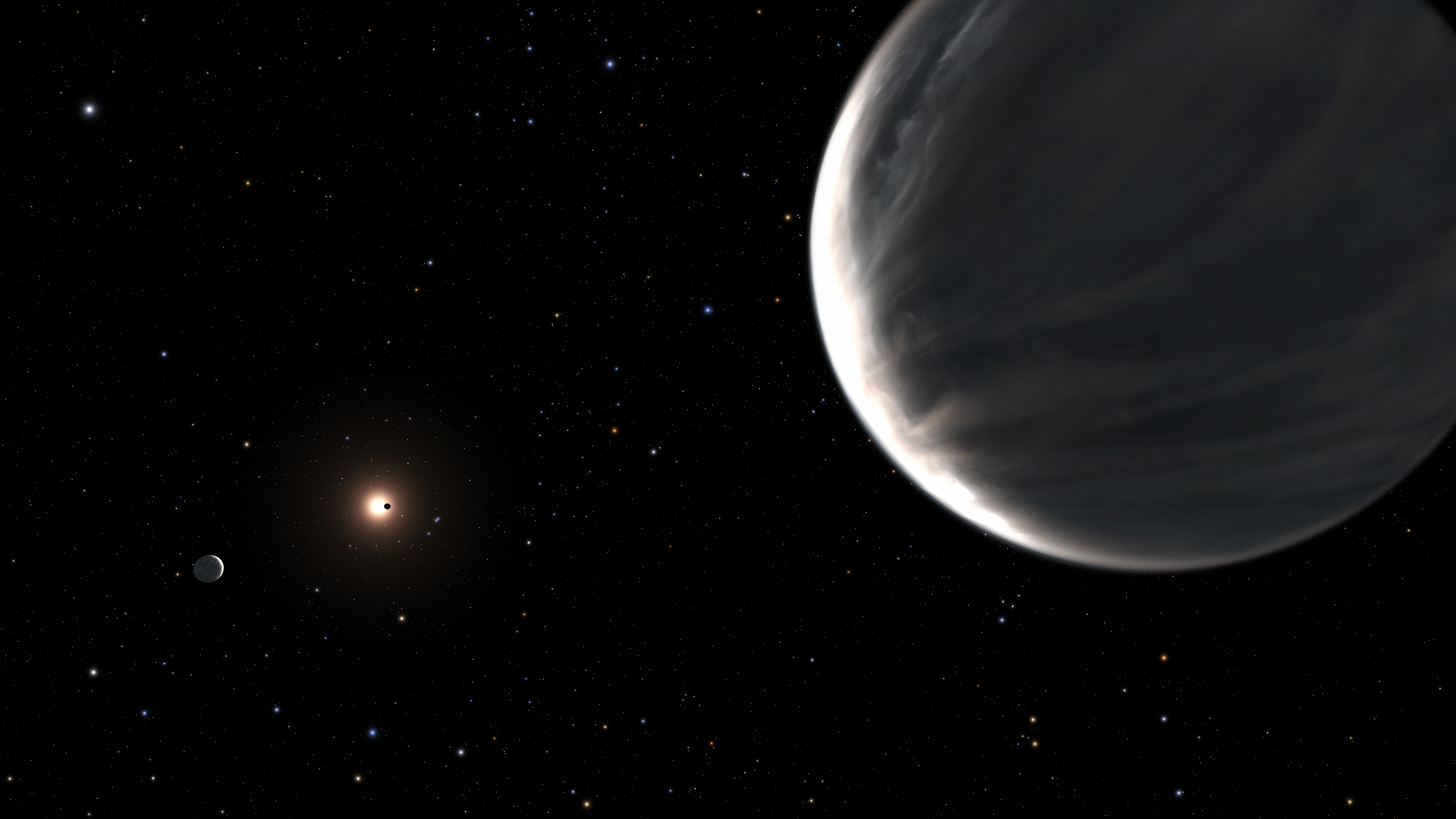
- Artist's impression of the planets orbiting Kepler-138

Observation data Epoch J2000 Equinox ICRS
- Constellation: Lyra
- Right ascension: 19^{h} 21^{m} 31.56798^{s}
- Declination: +43° 17′ 34.6810″
- Apparent magnitude (V): 13.040±0.092

Characteristics
- Evolutionary stage: main sequence
- Spectral type: M1V
- Apparent magnitude (V): 13.040±0.092
- Apparent magnitude (Kepler): 12.925

Astrometry
Radial velocity (R_{v})	−37.25±0.72 km/s
Proper motion (μ)	RA: −20.461±0.012 mas/yr Dec.: 22.641±0.012 mas/yr
Parallax (π)	14.9019±0.0097 mas
Distance	218.9 ± 0.1 ly (67.11 ± 0.04 pc)
Absolute magnitude (M_{V})	8.81 ± 0.28

Details
Mass	0.535±0.012 M_{☉}
Radius	0.535+0.013 −0.014 R_{☉}
Luminosity (bolometric)	0.056±0.004 L_{☉}
Luminosity (visual, L_{V})	0.026 ± 0.006 L_{☉}
Surface gravity (log g)	4.71±0.03 cgs
Temperature	3726+44 −40 K
Metallicity [Fe/H]	-0.28 ± 0.10 dex
Rotation	19.394±0.013 days
Rotational velocity (v sin i)	~3 km/s
Age	>1 Gyr

Other designations
- Kepler-138, KOI-314, KIC 7603200, TIC 159376971, 2MASS J19213157+4317347

Database references
SIMBAD	data
Exoplanet Archive	data
KIC	data

Kepler-138, also known as KOI-314, is a red dwarf located in the constellation Lyra, 219 light years from Earth. It is located within the field of vision of the Kepler spacecraft, the satellite that NASA's Kepler Mission used to detect planets transiting their stars.

The star hosts three confirmed planets and a likely fourth, including the lowest-mass exoplanet with a measured mass and size discovered to date, Kepler-138b, with a mass comparable to that of Mars. Kepler-138d is remarkable for its low density; initially thought likely to be a gas dwarf, more recent observations as of 2022 show that it, as well as planet c, are likely to be ocean worlds.

== Nomenclature and history ==
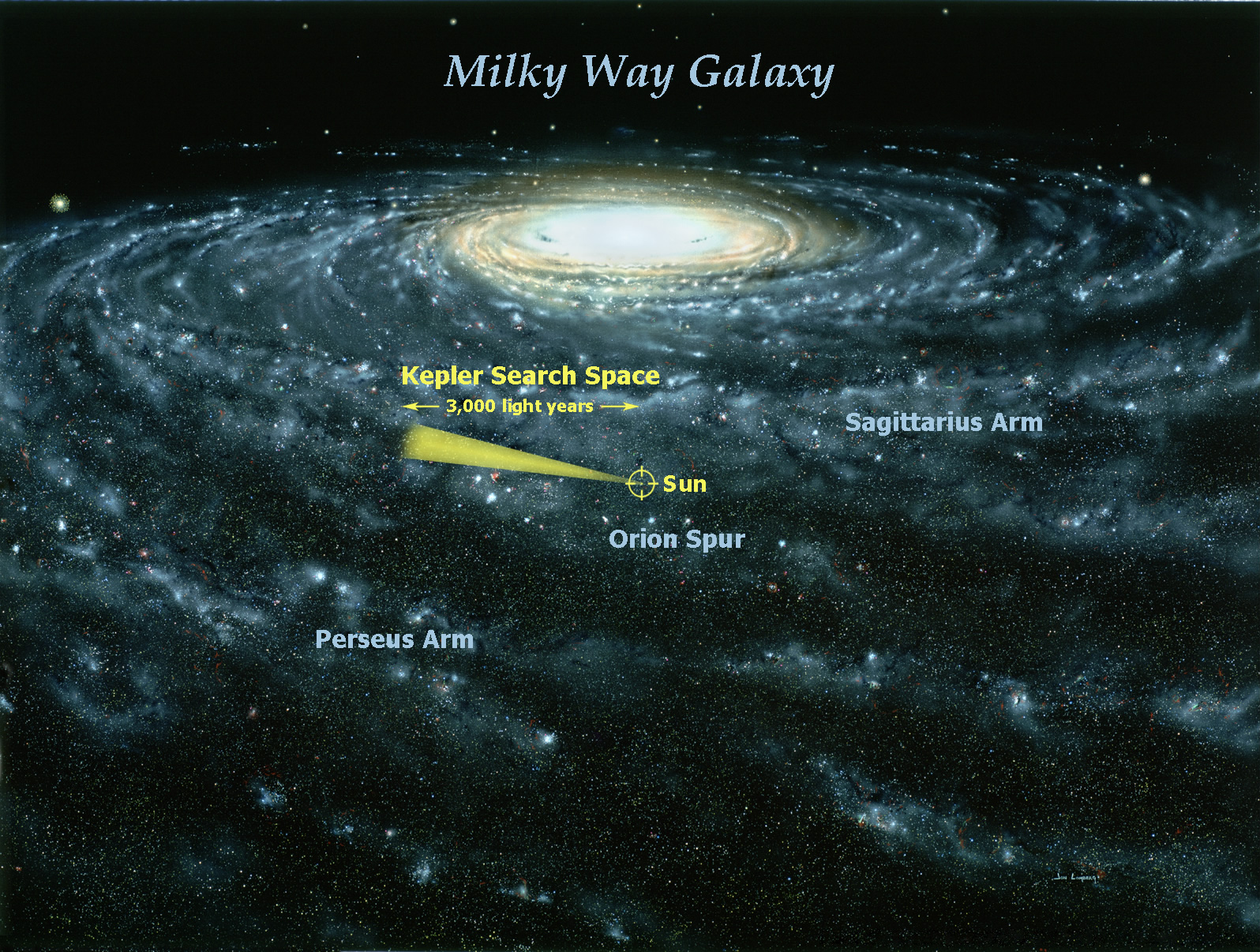
The Kepler Space Telescope search volume, in the context of the Milky Way Galaxy.

Prior to Kepler observation, KOI-314 had the 2MASS catalogue number 2MASS J19213157+4317347. In the Kepler Input Catalog it has the designation of KIC 7603200, and when it was found to have transiting planet candidates it was given the Kepler object of interest number of KOI-314.

Planetary candidates were detected around the star by NASA's Kepler Mission, a mission tasked with discovering planets in transit around their stars. The transit method that Kepler uses involves detecting dips in brightness in stars. These dips in brightness can be interpreted as planets whose orbits pass in front of their stars from the perspective of Earth, although other phenomena can also be responsible which is why the term planetary candidate is used. By timing these dips, gravitational interactions were detected between two of the candidates, allowing for a measurement of their masses and confirmation as real planets given that the masses were significantly below the deuterium burning limits.

Following the acceptance of the discovery paper, the Kepler team provided an additional moniker for the system of "Kepler-138". However, the planets were discovered by scientists outside of the Kepler team who referred to the star as KOI-314, as the Kepler designation had not been assigned yet.

Candidate planets that are associated with stars studied by the Kepler Mission are assigned the designations ".01", ".02", ".03", etc. after the star's name, in the order of discovery. If planet candidates are detected simultaneously, then the ordering follows the order of orbital periods from shortest to longest. Following these rules, the first two candidate planets were detected simultaneously and assigned the names KOI-314.01 and KOI-314.02, with respective orbital periods of 13.8 and 23.1 days. Over a year later, a much smaller planet candidate was detected and assigned the name KOI-314.03, despite being the shortest orbital period planet (period of 10.3 days) found in the system.

Confirmed planets are conventionally assigned the designations b, c, d, etc. after the star's name. The labels are assigned alphabetically in the order of discovery starting from b. Since KOI-314.01 and KOI-314.02 were confirmed as planets simultaneously, the alphabetical names were assigned in order of orbital period by the discoverers, and thus became KOI-314b and KOI-314c respectively. Since no gravitational interactions were detected due to KOI-314.03, this planetary candidate remained unconfirmed as 6 January 2014 and thus kept the same name.

In the following weeks, on 28 February 2014, a new paper validated KOI-314.03 as being a real planet with a false alarm probability of less than 1%. The new paper used different names for the planets, going from KOI-314b to Kepler-138c, KOI-314c to Kepler-138d and KOI-314.03 to Kepler-138b. These designations have been used by subsequent studies, and by databases such as the NASA Exoplanet Archive. This situation is similar to that of some other planetary systems such as Mu Arae, where different designations have been used for the same planets in the literature.

On 16 December 2022, two possible Earth-like water worlds Kepler-138 c and Kepler-138 d were detected in the Kepler 138 system by the Hubble and Spitzer Space Telescopes.

== Stellar characteristics ==
Kepler-138 is a red dwarf with approximately 54% the mass of and 54% the radius of the Sun. It has a surface temperature of 3726+44
−40 K. In comparison, the Sun has a surface temperature of 5778 K. Kepler-138's apparent magnitude (how bright it appears from Earth's perspective) is 13.04, too dim to be seen with the naked eye.

== Planetary system ==
The three inner known planets of Kepler-138 transit the star; this means that all three planets' orbits appear to cross in front of their star as viewed from the Earth's perspective. Their inclinations relative to Earth's line of sight, or how far above or below the plane of sight they are, vary by less than one degree. This allows direct measurements of the planets' orbital periods and relative diameters (compared to the host star) by monitoring each planet's transit of the star. There is also a likely fourth non-transiting planet, Kepler-138e, detected through transit-timing variations.

Although the innermost planet has a size similar to Mars, Kepler-138c and d both have a radius of about 1.5 Earth radii (revised from earlier estimates of 1.2 Earth radii). Although Kepler-138c and d have similar radii, their masses and densities were initially thought to vary greatly. Of these two, the inner planet was thought to be consistent with a rocky super-Earth, whereas the outer planet's low density implies it may have a substantial proportion of water ice or a significant gas envelope, resembling a miniaturized gas giant (a gas dwarf). The striking differences between these two planets have been hypothesized to be due to photoevaporation. However, more recent observations as of 2022 have found similarly low densities for both planets c and d, suggesting that they are likely to be ocean worlds. The mass of candidate Kepler-138e would be intermediate of Mars and Venus. While a radius could not be estimated for planet e, it is likely smaller than c and d and larger than b, which is consistent with an Earth-like composition.

The three inner planets are too close to their star to be considered within the habitable zone, while the likely planet Kepler-138e orbits near the inner edge of the habitable zone.

The Kepler-138 planetary system
Companion (in order from star)	Mass	Semimajor axis (AU)	Orbital period (days)	Eccentricity	Inclination (°)	Radius
b	0.07±0.02 M_{🜨}	0.0753±0.0006	10.3134±0.0003	0.020±0.009	88.67±0.08	0.64±0.02 R_{🜨}
c	2.3+0.6 −0.5 M_{🜨}	0.0913±0.0007	13.78150+0.00007 −0.00009	0.017+0.008 −0.007	89.02±0.07	1.51±0.04 R_{🜨}
d	2.1+0.6 −0.7 M_{🜨}	0.1288±0.0010	23.0923±0.0006	0.010±0.005	89.04±0.04	1.51±0.04 R_{🜨}
e (unconfirmed)	0.43+0.21 −0.10 M_{🜨}	0.1803±0.0014	38.230±0.006	0.112+0.018 −0.024	88.53±1.0°	—

== See also ==
- Hunt for Exomoons with Kepler
- List of multiplanetary systems
