= HR Lyrae =

Nova that appeared in 1919

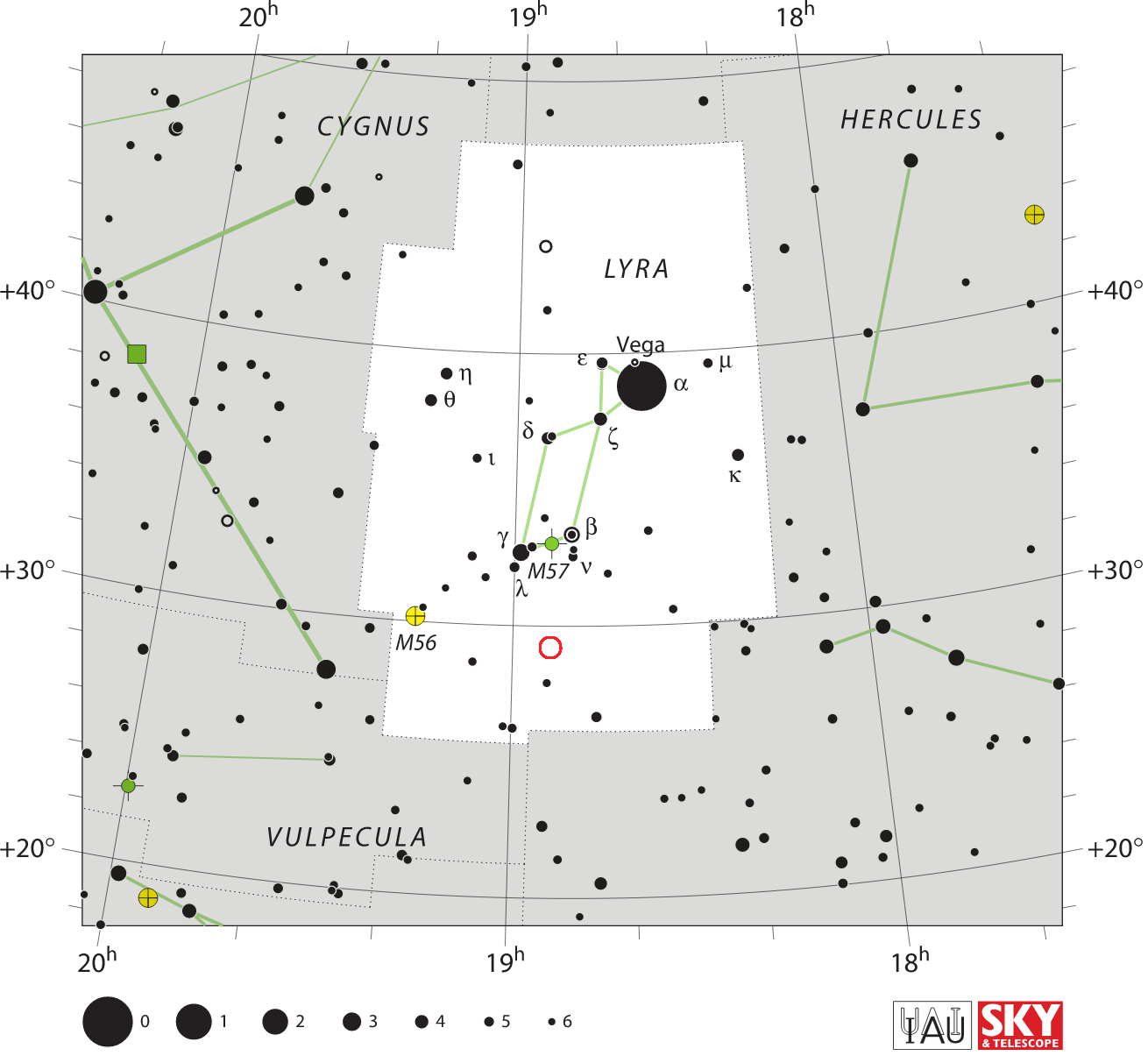
- Location of HR Lyrae (circled in red)

Observation data Epoch J2000.0 Equinox ICRS
- Constellation: Lyra
- Right ascension: 18^{h} 53^{m} 25.0564^{s}
- Declination: +29° 13′ 37.666″
- Apparent magnitude (V): 6.5 Max. 15.5 Min.

Characteristics
- Variable type: Classical Nova

Astrometry
Proper motion (μ)	RA: −1.926±0.056 mas/yr Dec.: −7.621±0.056 mas/yr
Parallax (π)	0.1825±0.0337 mas
Distance	4797+1015 −470 pc

Other designations
- Nova Lyrae 1919, HD 175268, 2MASS J18532505+2913377, Gaia DR2 2040551920255615104

Database references
SIMBAD	data

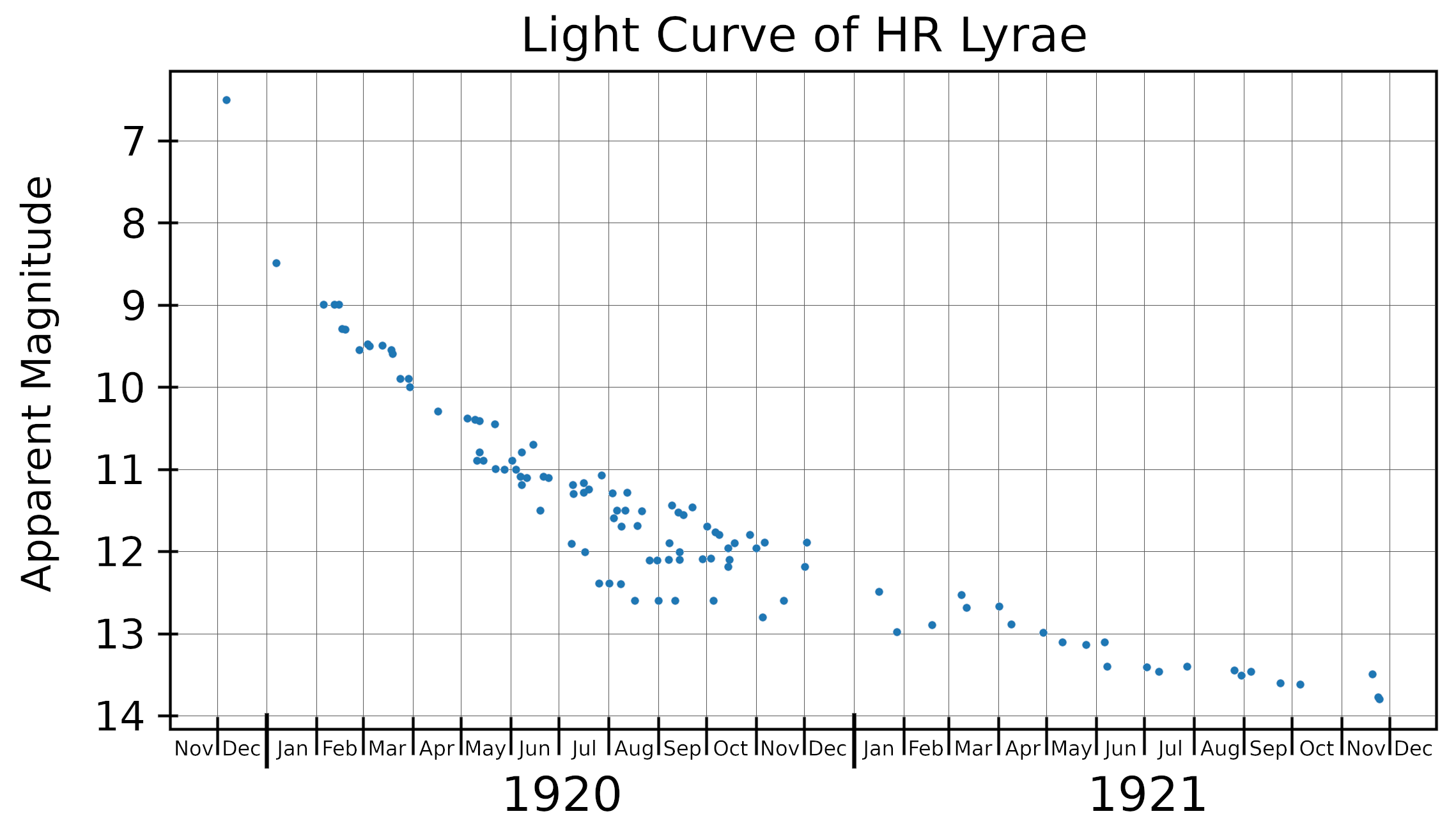
The light curve of HR Lyrae, plotted from data presented in Shears & Poyner (2007)

HR Lyrae or Nova Lyrae 1919 was a nova which occurred in the constellation Lyra in 1919. Its discovery was announced by Johanna C. Mackie on 6 December 1919. She discovered it while examining photographic plates taken at the Harvard College Observatory. The bulletin announcing the discovery (H.C.O. bulletin 705) states "Between December 4 and 6 it rose rapidly from the sixteenth magnitude or fainter, to a maximum of about 6.5". It was the first nova ever reported in Lyra, and Mackie was awarded the AAVSO gold medal for her discovery. Its peak magnitude of 6.5 implies that it might have been visible to the naked eye, under ideal conditions.

HR Lyrae's outburst occurred in December 1919, when Lyra was only visible in the early evening for most northern observers. Visibility was even more limited in the first months of 1920, so its light curve near maximum brightness is poorly sampled. But it is very likely that it declined from peak brightness by 3 magnitudes in less than 100 days, making it a "fast" nova. By November 1921 the star had dimmed to 14th magnitude, which is close to its quiescent brightness. It continues to show brightness fluctuations of 1 magnitude or less above its quiescent magnitude with no clear periodicity, as well as dimming (down to 17th magnitude) episodes. Although only one nova event has been seen, there are suggestions based primarily on the light curve that HR Lyrae might be a recurrent nova.

All novae are binary stars, with a "donor" star orbiting a white dwarf. The two stars are so close to each other that matter is transferred from the donor to the white dwarf. In the case of HR Lyrae the binary's orbital period is uncertain, but a value of 2.4 hours has been reported. The white dwarf's mass has been estimated to be 0.78±0.15M_{☉}
