= NGC 6629 =

Planetary nebula in Lyra

Emission nebula
- Planetary nebula
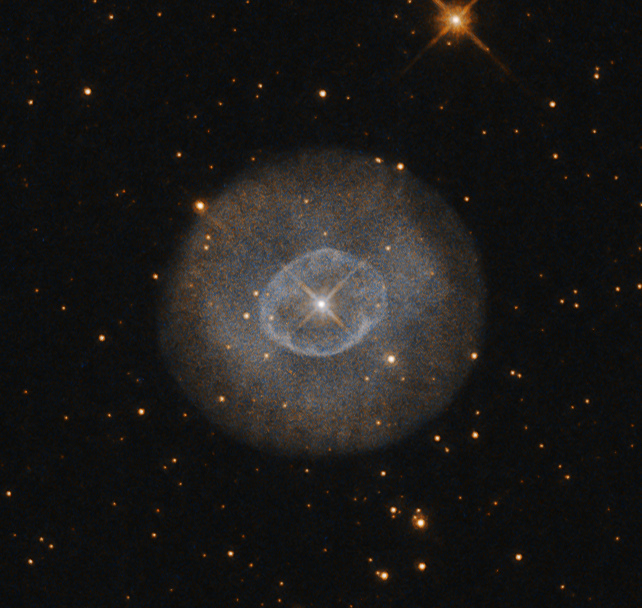
- The NGC 6629 planetary nebula, as seen by the Hubble Space Telescope

Observation data: J2000 epoch
- Right ascension: 18^{h} 25^{m} 43^{s}
- Declination: −23° 12′ 10″
- Distance: 6,523.13 ly (2000 pc)
- Apparent magnitude (V): 11.3
- Apparent dimensions (V): 16.6″ × 15.5″
- Constellation: Sagittarius
- Designations: PN G009.4-05.0: NGC 6629, PK 9-05.1, ARO 30, ESO 522-26, He 2- 399, Sa 2-335

NGC 6629 is a planetary nebula in the constellation of Sagittarius, located above the "Teapot". It is located approximately 2.0 kpc (~6,523 light years) from the Sun. The object formed when a star ejected its outer layers during the late stages of its evolution. The remnant core of the star, a white dwarf, is emitting vast amounts of ultraviolet radiation that ionizes, or excites, the gas surrounding it, making the nebula visible to the human eye through a telescope. Over the course of around 10,000 years the white dwarf will cool down dramatically, diminishing the light of the nebula and making it only visible in a long-exposure photograph. NGC 6629 was discovered by William Herschel in 1868.

On June 26, 2029, the planetary nebula will be occulted by the Moon during a total lunar eclipse, over the eastern Pacific and South America.

== See also ==
- List of planetary nebulae
- Messier object
- New General Catalogue
- List of NGC objects
- NGC 6565
- Ring Nebula

== Bibliography ==
- Vallenari, A.; et al. (Gaia collaboration) (2023). "Gaia Data Release 3. Summary of the content and survey properties". Astronomy and Astrophysics. 674: A1. arXiv:2208.00211. Bibcode:2023A&A...674A...1G. doi:10.1051/0004-6361/202243940. S2CID 244398875.

Gaia DR3 record for this source at VizieR.

- Coe, Steven R. (2007). Nebulae and how to observe them. Astronomers' observing guides. Springer. p. 111. ISBN 978-1-84628-482-3.
- Crossen, Craig; Rhemann, Gerald (2004). Sky Vistas: Astronomy for Binoculars and Richest-field Telescopes. Springer. p. 261. ISBN 978-3-211-00851-5.
- Steinicke, Wolfgang (2010). Observing and Cataloguing Nebulae and Star Clusters: From Herschel to Dreyer's New General Catalogue. Cambridge University Press. pp. 42–43. ISBN 978-0-521-19267-5.
