= Beals (crater) =

Lunar impact crater

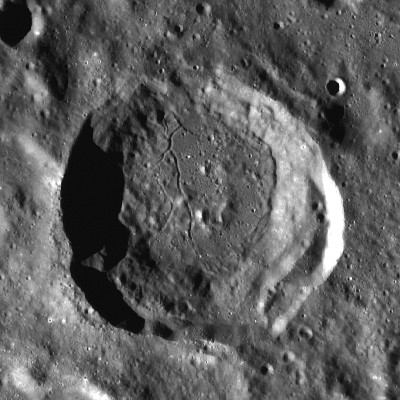
- LRO image
- Coordinates: 37.3°N 86.5°E
- Diameter: 52.61 km (32.69 mi)
- Depth: Unknown
- Colongitude: 277° at sunrise
- Eponym: Carlyle S. Beals

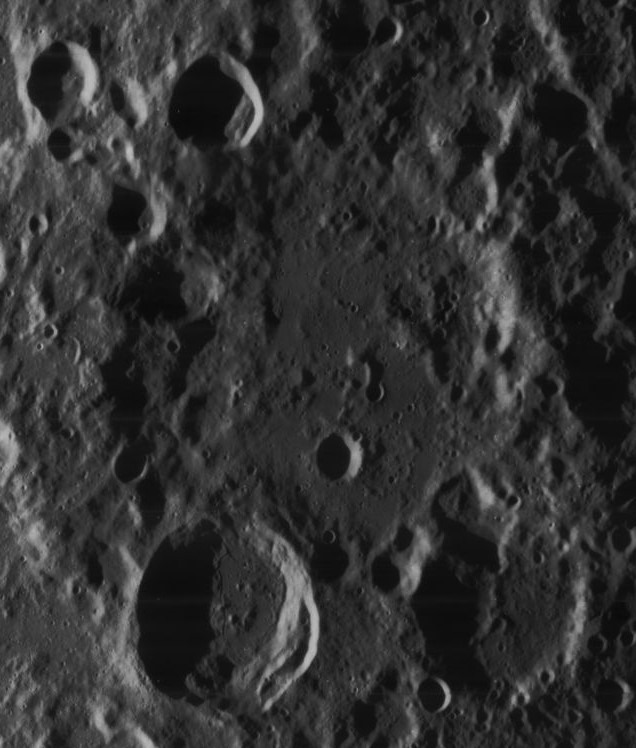
Oblique Lunar Orbiter 4 image centered on Riemann with Beals at lower left

Beals is a lunar impact crater that is located near the eastern limb of the Moon, and lies across the southwestern rim of the much larger crater Riemann. From the Earth the crater is viewed nearly from on edge, and is best seen during favorable librations. To the west is the large walled plain called Gauss.

This crater formation is only lightly worn, with no significant impacts within its perimeter. The inner wall is narrower along the north-northeast face where the crater intrudes into Riemann, and the rim is somewhat irregular at the southern end. The interior floor is fractured, and has a few low ridges located near the midpoint.

Beals was formerly designated Riemann A, a satellite crater of Riemann, until the International Astronomical Union renamed it in 1982 to commemorate Carlyle S. Beals (1899-1979), a Canadian astronomer. Prior being designated Riemann A, this crater was known as Crater 110.
