= Seneca (crater) =

Crater on the Moon

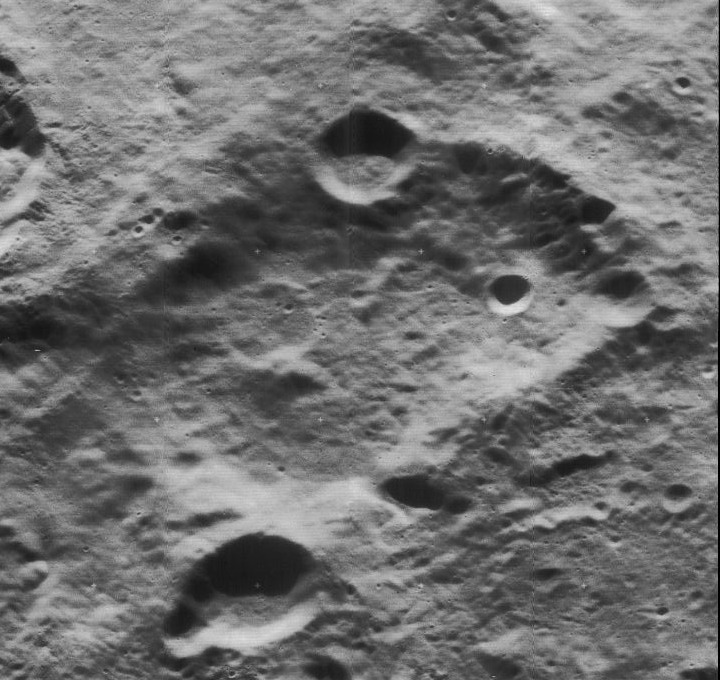
- Oblique Lunar Orbiter 4 image
- Coordinates: 26.6°N 80.2°E
- Diameter: 46 km
- Depth: Unknown
- Colongitude: 280° at sunrise
- Eponym: Lucius A. Seneca

Seneca is a lunar impact crater that is located towards the east-northeastern limb, less than one crater diameter to the north of Plutarch. To the northwest is the crater Hahn, and due north lies the large walled plain called Gauss.

This crater has been heavily eroded by impacts, with an outer rim that has been distorted and overlain by several small craters. It appears roughly diamond-shaped as viewed from above, although it is heavily foreshortened when seen from the Earth. A small crater lies along the western rim and inner wall. The small crater Seneca D is attached to the eastern exterior. There is also a smaller crater across the northern apex of the rim. The interior floor is somewhat irregular, particularly in the southern half.

== Satellite craters ==
By convention these features are identified on lunar maps by placing the letter on the side of the crater midpoint that is closest to Seneca.

Seneca	Latitude	Longitude	Diameter
A	26.4° N	75.7° E	17 km
B	27.2° N	77.4° E	28 km
C	26.3° N	75.1° E	22 km
D	26.6° N	81.3° E	18 km
E	29.2° N	79.6° E	16 km
F	29.5° N	81.9° E	15 km
G	29.4° N	83.2° E	19 km

Seneca F dates to the Copernican period and has a meteoritic iron-rich impact melt.
