= Friedrich von Hahn =

German astronomer

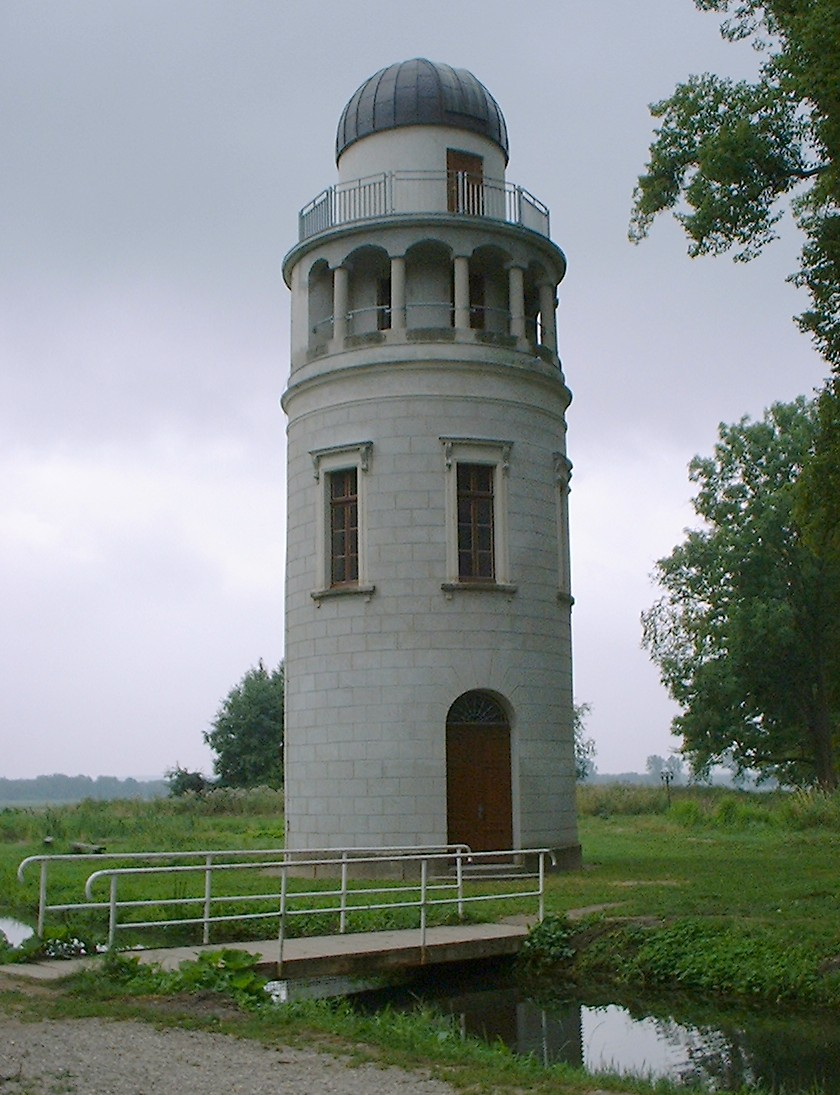
Reconstructed tower of the Remplin Observatory

Friedrich II. Graf von Hahn (July 27, 1742 – October 9, 1805) was a German nobleman, a philosopher and astronomer born in Neuhaus, Duchy of Holstein, Holy Roman Empire (the area was also at the same time part of Denmark-Norway). He suggested the Doppler effect before Doppler.

== Career ==
In 1793 Von Hahn started the construction of a private observatory, the first in Mecklenburg, which was well equipped. He owned some of the largest mirrors made by William Herschel and precision instruments for determining the position of stars. He used his instruments in order to observe various stars, including the sun, planets, and nebulae.

Von Hahn spent a significant amount of time observing the nebula NGC 3242, originally discovered by William Herschel. He documented the change in position and shape of the nebula over the course of a year. He also observed the Mira star system, which he had erroneously thought to be a nebula. The discovery Von Hahn in best known for is his 1800 discovery of the central star in the Ring Nebula M 57, in the constellation, Lyra. This discovery contributed to Antoine Darquier de Pellepoix's discovery of the nebula 21 years earlier.

== Death and memory ==
He died in Remplin, Mecklenburg, Germany on October 9, 1805 at the age of 63. After his death, his son, the "theatrical count" and father of author Ida, Countess von Hahn-Hahn, squandered his fortune and all books and instruments were sold. The best instruments were bought by Friedrich Wilhelm Bessel for the new observatory in Königsberg. One instrument is on display in the Deutsches Museum in Munich. His herschelian telescope was acquired in 1812 by the Neapolitan astronomer, Federigo Zuccari, for the new Capodimonte Observatory. Now the mirror of this telescope is part of the Observatory Museum collection.

He is honoured together with Otto Hahn by the lunar crater Hahn.
