= Berosus =

Berosus may refer to:

- In Greek mythology:
  - Berosus, father of Tanais by Lysippe (Amazon)
  - Berosus, father of the Sibyl Sabbe by Erymanthe
- Berossus (3rd century BC), Hellenistic-era Babylonian writer and astronomer
- Berosus (beetle), a genus of beetles of the family Hydrophilidae
- Berosus (crater), a lunar crater
