= NGC 6565 =

Planetary nebula in the constellation Sagittarius

Emission nebula
- Planetary nebula
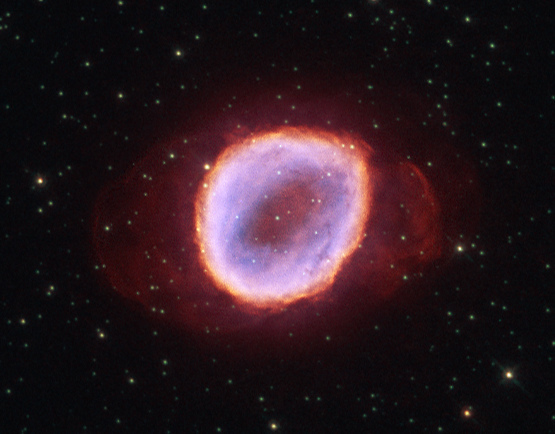
- A Hubble Space Telescope (HST) image of NGC 6565. Credit: HST/NASA/ESA.

Observation data: J2000 epoch
- Right ascension: 18^{h} 11^{m} 52.5^{s}
- Declination: −28° 10′ 42″
- Distance: 14,000 ly
- Apparent magnitude (V): 13
- Apparent dimensions (V): 10" x 8"
- Constellation: Sagittarius
- Designations: ESO 456-70

NGC 6565 (also known as ESO 456-70) is a planetary nebula in the constellation of Sagittarius. The object formed when a star ejected its outer layers during the late stages of its evolution. The remnant core of the star, a white dwarf, is emitting vast amounts of ultraviolet radiation that ionizes, or excites, the gas surrounding it, making the nebula visible to the human eye through a telescope. Over the course of around 10,000 years the white dwarf will cool down dramatically, diminishing the light of the nebula and making it only visible in a long-exposure photograph.

The nebula of NGC 6565 is thought to be composed of three different zones. The inner zone, which is the bright circle seen in the featured image, is heavily ionized gas. A surrounding envelope of gas, seen as a faint red glow in the image, is ionized to a much lesser extent. Lastly, an extended halo, invisible in this image, is nearly neutral, or almost not ionized at all. The inner zone is the shape of a triaxial ellipsoid that we see nearly pole-on. This is the part that can be seen by the human eye through a telescope. An unknown force pushed out the gas at the poles, creating two faint cups at either end of the ellipse. It is thought that this inner zone would look like NGC 6886 if viewed from a different angle. In fact, NGC 6565 is very similar to NGC 6886 in many respects, including nebular spectrum, structure, luminosity, and temperature of the central star.

NGC 6565 was entered into the New General Catalog (NGC) by John Louis Emil Dreyer in 1888. The object has a visual magnitude of about 13 and a diameter of 8 x 10 arcseconds. It is heading in the direction of the sun at 4.9 kilometers (3 miles) a second. Distances to all but a few planetary nebulae are notoriously difficult to determine; older estimates put NGC 6565 at 6500 light-years, and newer estimates place it at up to 15,000 light-years.

== See also ==
- The Ring and Helix Nebulae (which have undergone a similar process and are larger planetary nebulae of the same type)
- List of NGC objects
- Planetary nebulae
