= Helen D. Beals =

Canadian artist and educator

- Born: Helen Dorothy Beals; May 27, 1898; Canso, Nova Scotia, Canada
- Died: April 17, 1991 (aged 92); Wolfville, Nova Scotia, Canada
- Education: Acadia University, Simmons College
- Known for: Painting, Pottery, Education

Helen D. Beals (May 27, 1898 – April 17, 1991) was a Canadian artist and educator. She is best-known for her involvement with the Maritime Art Association and the publication Maritime Art Magazine.

== Biography ==
Helen Dorothy Beals was born in 1898 in Canso, Nova Scotia, the elder sister of astronomer Carlyle Smith Beals.

After graduating from Acadia University in 1919, Beals traveled to Boston, Massachusetts to study at Simmons College. In 1920, she earned a certificate in Library Sciences. Beals worked as a librarian, first in Cambridge, Massachusetts at the Episcopal Theological School, then in Wolfville, Nova Scotia at Acadia University.

Beals was a founding member of the Maritime Art Association and was involved with the publication of Maritime Art Magazine.

Concurrent with her positions at Acadia University, Beal served as Walter Abell's assistant in the Department of Art and also as his assistant at Maritime Art Magazine. In 1945, Beals became the Head of the Department of Art at Acadia University and continued until 1963.

Throughout her academic career Beals continued to paint and exhibit her works at the Nova Scotia Society of Artists, the Maritime Art Association, and the Canadian Society of Painters in Water Colour. Beals was also a potter and a member of the Minas Potters Guild.

Beals died on April 17, 1991, aged 92, in Wolfville, Nova Scotia.
