= Gauss (crater) =

Crater on the Moon

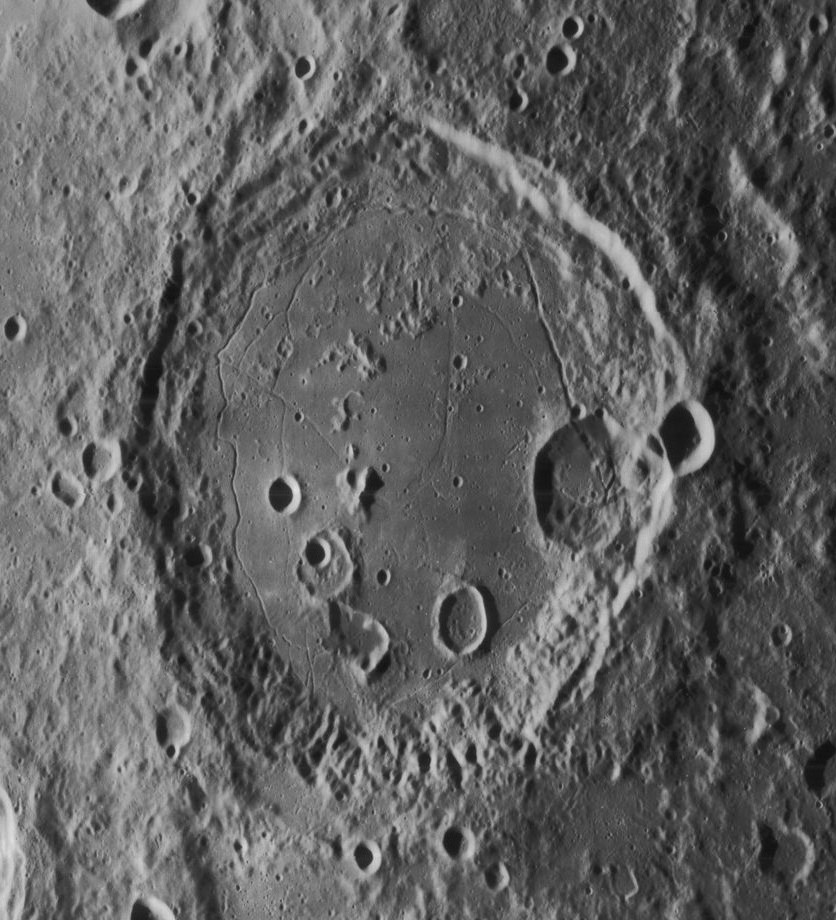
- Oblique Lunar Orbiter 4 image
- Coordinates: 35.9°N 79.1°E
- Diameter: 177 km
- Depth: 3.6 km
- Colongitude: 284° at sunrise
- Formation: Nectarian
- Eponym: Carl F. Gauss

Gauss is a large lunar impact crater, named after Carl Friedrich Gauss, that is located near the northeastern limb of the Moon's near side. It belongs to a category of lunar formations called a walled plain, meaning that it has a diameter of at least 110 kilometers, with a somewhat sunken floor and little or no central massif. Due to its location, this crater appears considerably foreshortened when viewed from the Earth, and its visibility is affected by libration.

To the northeast of Gauss is Riemann, another walled plain that lies even closer to the limb. Southwest of Gauss is the crater pair of Hahn and Berosus. Almost directly southward is Seneca.

On the lunar geologic timescale, Gauss is one of the largest craters of Nectarian age. The rim of Gauss is better formed in the northern half, and the inner walls have some terracing along the northwest and appear slumped in the northeast. The southern half of the rim is somewhat more eroded.

The interior floor is fairly flat in places, with several craters marking the surface in the southern half. There is a "grand central mountain", offset from the center. The infrared spectrum of pure crystalline plagioclase has been identified on and around this peak. There is also a small crater, Gauss B, lying along the interior of the eastern rim, with the smaller Gauss A lying across the rim just to the northeast of Gauss B. The floor of Gauss is marked by several clefts, particularly along the eastern and northwestern edges. The uneven crater rims in the south and a series of rises in the north gives the appearance of a ridge line that traverses the crater floor from north to south.

== Views ==
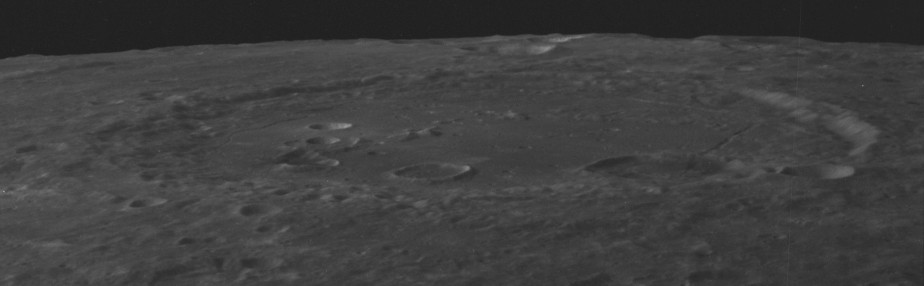
Gauss crater from Apollo 14

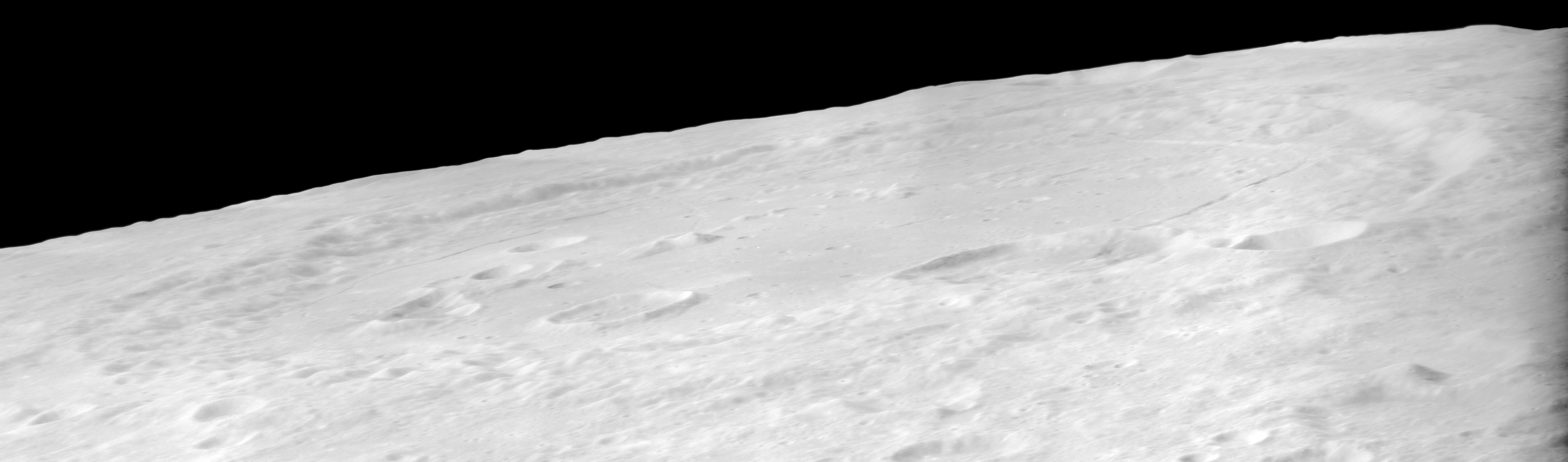
Gauss crater from Apollo 16

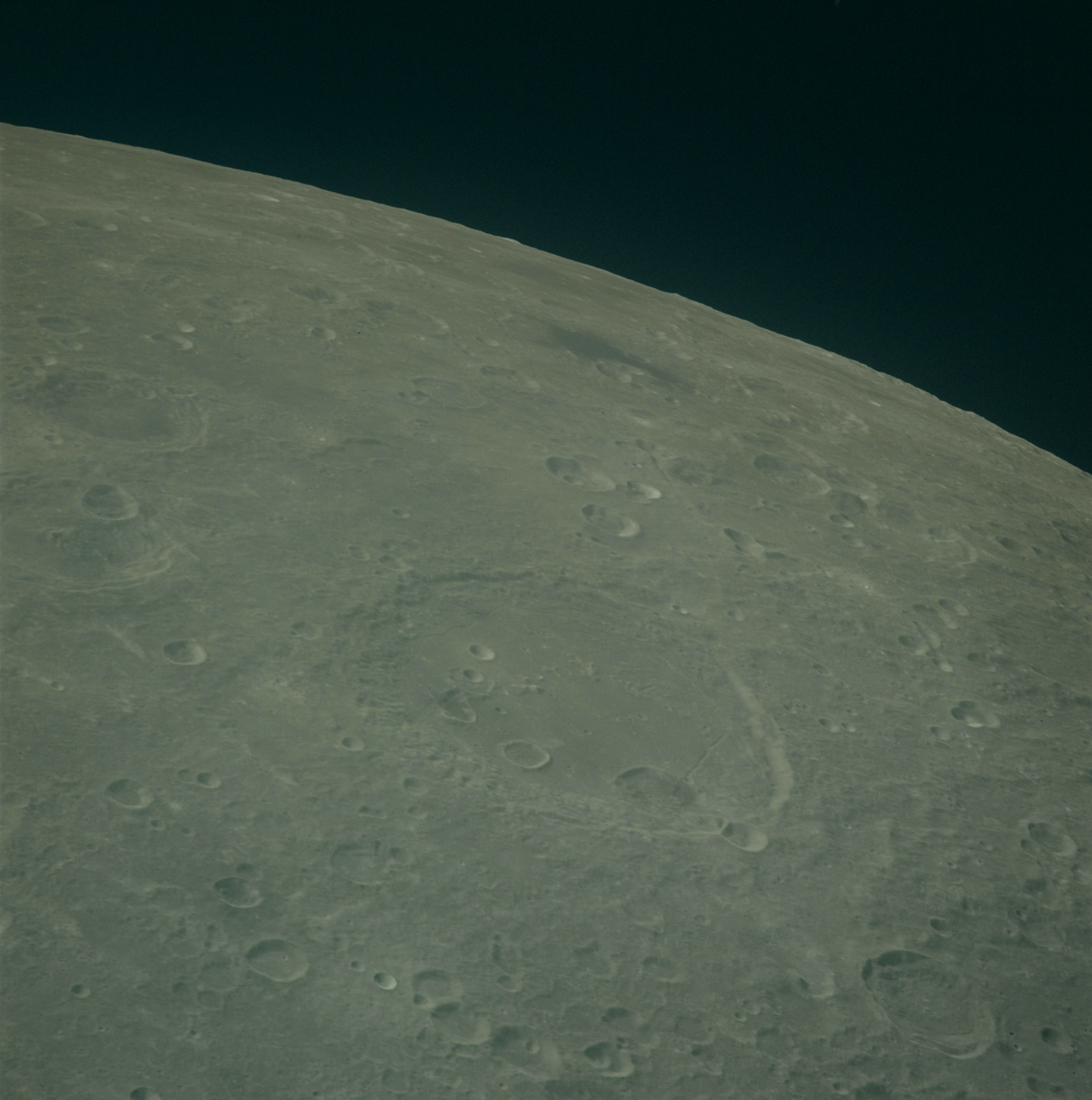
Regional view with Gauss below center and Lacus Spei (dark patch near horizon)

== Satellite craters ==
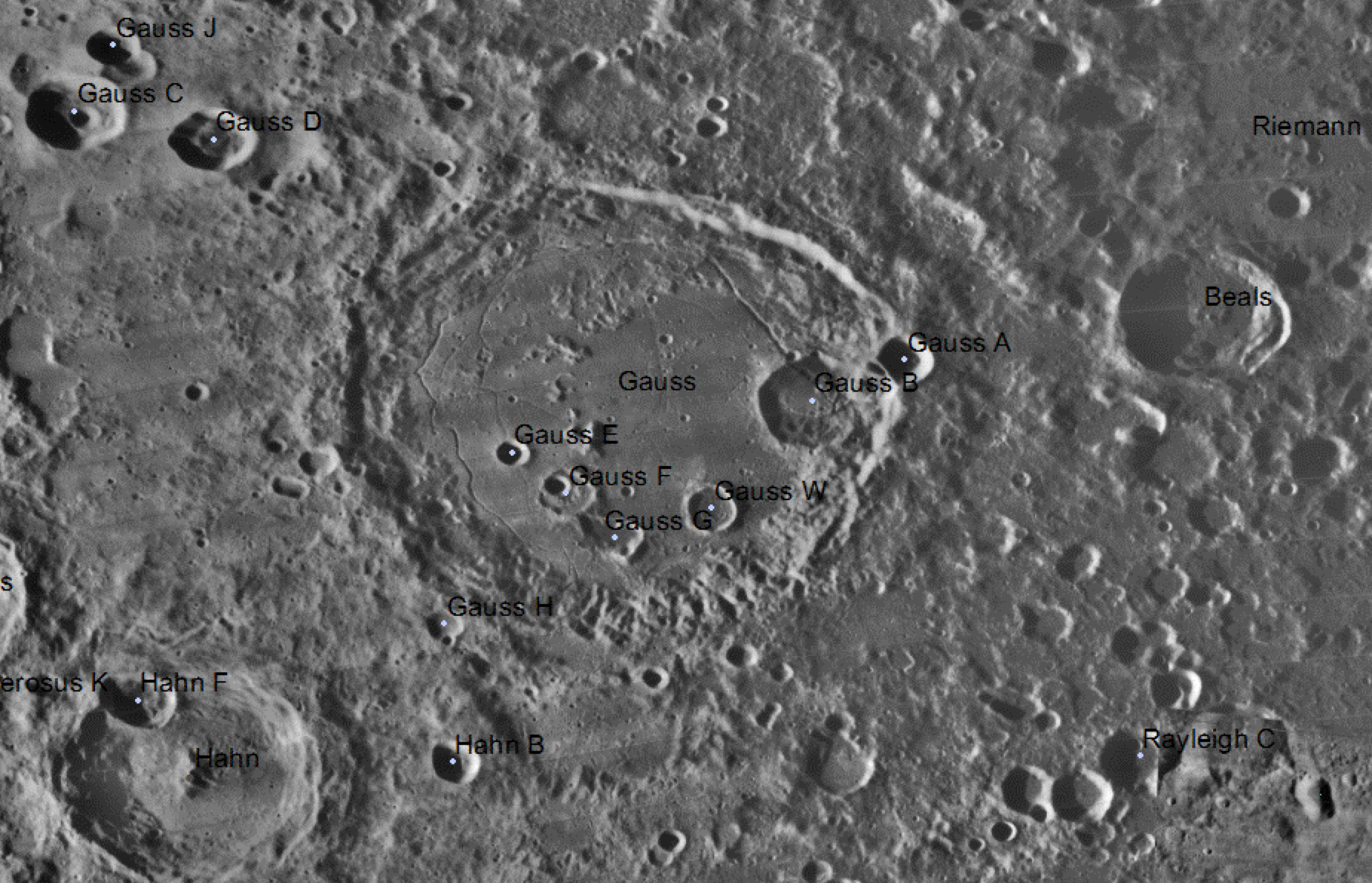

By convention these features are identified on lunar maps by placing the letter on the side of the crater midpoint that is closest to Gauss.

Gauss	Latitude	Longitude	Diameter	Ref
A	36.5° N	82.7° E	18 km	WGPSN
B	35.9° N	81.2° E	37 km	WGPSN
C	39.7° N	72.1° E	29 km	WGPSN
D	39.3° N	73.8° E	24 km	WGPSN
E	35.3° N	77.6° E	8 km	WGPSN
F	34.8° N	78.3° E	20 km	WGPSN
G	34.2° N	78.6° E	18 km	WGPSN
H	33.2° N	77.1° E	11 km	WGPSN
J	40.6° N	72.6° E	14 km	WGPSN
W	34.5° N	80.2° E	18 km	WGPSN

Gauss J dates to the Copernican period and has a meteoritic iron-rich impact melt.

== See also ==
- 1001 Gaussia, asteroid named after Gauss
