= Carlyle S. Beals =

Canadian astronomer (1899 – 1979)

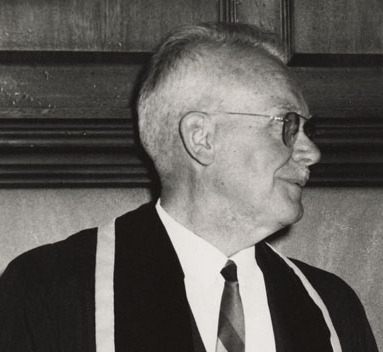
- Born: Carlyle Smith Beals; June 29, 1899; Canso, Nova Scotia, Canada
- Died: July 2, 1979 (aged 80); Ottawa, Ontario, Canada
- Education: Acadia University (BA); University of Toronto (MA); Imperial College London (PhD)
- Known for: Research on Wolf-Rayet and P Cygni stars, the Interstellar Medium and meteorite impact craters
- Awards: Henry Marshall Tory Medal (1957), Leonard Medal, Order of Canada, Fellow of the Royal Society
- Scientific career
- Fields: Astronomy
- Doctoral advisor: Alfred Fowler

Carlyle Smith Beals, OC FRS (June 29, 1899 – July 2, 1979) was a Canadian astronomer.

== Early life and education ==
Carlyle Smith Beals was born in Canso, Nova Scotia to Rev. Francis H. P. Beals and his wife, Annie Florence Nightingale Smith Beals, on June 29, 1899. He is the brother of artist and educator Helen D. Beals.

Beals received a Bachelor of Arts degree from Acadia University in 1919, specializing in physics and mathematics. Although he wished to continue his studies, he was forced to postpone those plans due to poor health. He taught at a small country school in Nova Scotia during the winter of 1920.

He began his Ph.D. studies in physics at Yale University in 1921, but was forced to return home in the winter of 1921 when his health failed again. He resumed his graduate studies in 1922 at University of Toronto and received a master's degree in Physics in 1923. His master's thesis work on triboluminescence spectra, the frequencies of light generated by breaking chemical bonds, was done under the supervision of John Cunningham McLennan, one of the leading physicists in Canada at the time.

Beals spent one year as the Science Master at the High School of Quebec in Quebec City, before enrolling in a graduate programme in physics in 1924 at the Royal College of Science at Imperial College London. Working under Alfred Fowler, he studied the Zeeman effect and the spectra of palladium, copper, and ionized silver. During this time Beals became acquainted with observational astronomy by using the small observatory in the Royal College of Science building. He received a Ph.D. in 1926.

== Career ==
After obtaining his PhD, Beals returned to Acadia University as an assistant professor of physics, but left one year later for an Assistant Astronomer position at the Dominion Astrophysical Observatory (DAO), Victoria, British Columbia. Beals worked at the Dominion Astrophysical Observatory from 1927 until 1946, becoming Assistant Director of the DAO in 1940.

At the DAO, he studied emission lines in the spectra of hot stars and gas clouds in the interstellar medium. His work established a reliable temperature scale for hotter stars, based on their spectra. He showed that the broad emission lines seen in Wolf-Rayet and P Cygni-type stars were due to strong stellar winds. Beals was the first astronomer to quantitatively measure the ratio of sodium and calcium absorption lines in the interstellar medium (the gas between stars) and the ratio of the two lines in the sodium D doublet. He also found that rather than being uniform, the interstellar medium was clumpy and moved with different velocities.

During his time at the DAO, he developed several astronomical instruments to analyse astronomical spectra, including a self-recording micro-photometer and a high efficiency grating spectrograph.

During World War II, Beals spent two-year researching defenses against chemical weapons and designed gas masks.

In 1946, he left the Dominion Astrophysical Observatory in British Columbia and began work at the Dominion Observatory in Ottawa, Ontario. He was appointed Dominion Astronomer one year later, and began to rebuild the observatory's scientific programme, which had suffered due to budget cuts during the great depression and a lack of staff during World War II. He also oversaw the establishment of the Dominion Radio Astrophysical Observatory, near Penticton, British Columbia.

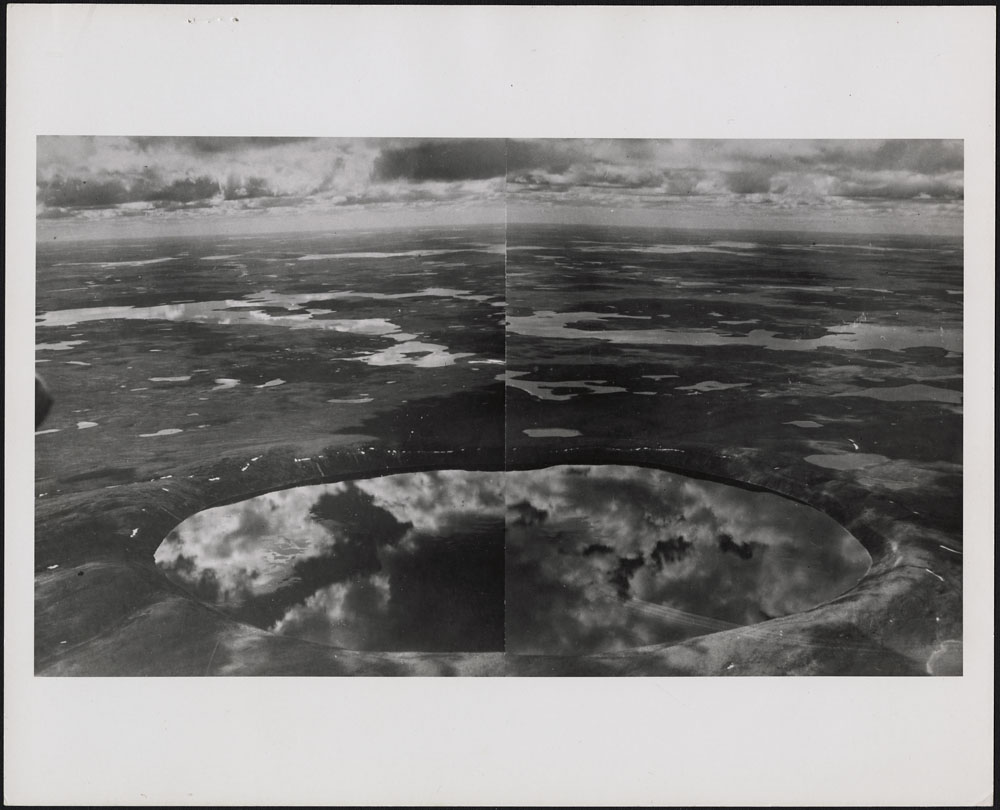
Aerial photograph of the Pingualuit (New Quebec) Crater used in Carlyle Beals' research on Canadian impact craters.

While in Ottawa, he became interested in the geophysical activities of the observatory. He began a study of meteorite impact craters in the Canadian shield, searching for circular features in aerial photographs and organising drill core studies of the most promising targets.

He retired in 1964, but continued his work on impact craters and published several works during his retirement.

== Awards and recognition ==
Beals was elected a fellow of the Royal Society of Canada in 1933. He was president of Academy of Science of the Royal Society of Canada from 1949-1950, and received the Henry Marshall Tory Medal from the Society in 1957 for outstanding achievement in scientific research.

He served as president of the Royal Astronomical Society of Canada from 1951-1952. He also served as president of the American Astronomical Society from 1962-1964, the only Canadian to hold the position.

In March 1951, Beals was elected a Fellow of the Royal Society of London. In 1966, he was awarded the inaugural Meteoritical Society Leonard Medal for his work on identifying Canadian impact craters. In 1969, he was made an Officer of the Order of Canada.

Beals received honorary degrees from Acadia University, the University of New Brunswick, Queen's University and the University of Pittsburgh.

The Carlyle S. Beals Award was established by the Canadian Astronomical Society (CASCA) in 1981.

The asteroid 3314 Beals and the crater Beals on the Moon are both named for Beals.

== Personal life ==
In 1931, Beals married Miriam White Bancroft, a professional musician and piano teacher. She was the daughter of Joseph Bancroft, a longtime Liberal member of the Nova Scotia House of Assembly. The couple adopted a daughter, Janitza.

Beals died on July 2, 1979, aged 80.

== Selected publications ==
- Beals, C. S. (1929). "On the Nature of Wolf-Rayet Emission. (Plates 7 and 8.)". Monthly Notices of the Royal Astronomical Society. 90 (2): 202–212. Bibcode:1929MNRAS..90..202B. doi:10.1093/mnras/90.2.202. ISSN 0035-8711.
- Beals, C. S. (1953). "The Spectra of the P Cygni Stars". Publications of the Dominion Astrophysical Observatory Victoria. 9: 1. Bibcode:1953PDAO....9....1B. ISSN 0078-6950.
- Beals, C. S.; Oke, J. B. (1953-10-01). "On the Relation Between Distance and Intensity For Interstellar Calcium and Sodium Lines". Monthly Notices of the Royal Astronomical Society. 113 (5): 530–552. Bibcode:1953MNRAS.113..530B. doi:10.1093/mnras/113.5.530. ISSN 0035-8711.
- Beals, C. S.; M., Ferguson, G.; A., Landau (1956). "Canadian Scientists Report (II. A Search for Analogies Between Lunar and Terrestrial Topography on Photographs of the Canadian Shield, Part I". Journal of the Royal Astronomical Society of Canada. 50: 203. Bibcode:1956JRASC..50..203B. ISSN 0035-872X.
- Beals, Carlyle Smith; Canada; Department of Energy, Mines and Resources (1968). Science, history and Hudson Bay. Ottawa: Dept. of Energy, Mines and Resources. OCLC 19459450.

== Archives ==
There is a Carlyle Beals fonds at Library and Archives Canada. Archival reference number is R15735.
