= Lemon Slice Nebula =

Planetary nebula in the constellation Camelopardalis

IC 3568
Emission nebula
- Planetary nebula
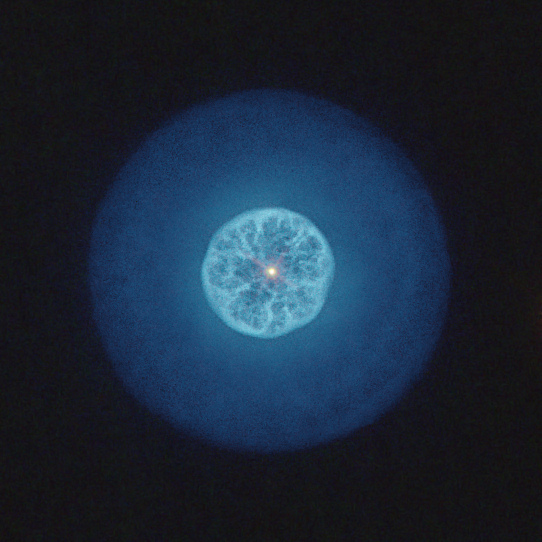
- Image of IC 3568 based on HST data

Observation data: J2000 epoch
- Right ascension: 12^{h} 33^{m} 06^{s}
- Declination: +82° 34′ 00″
- Distance: Roughly 4.5⋅10^{3} ly
- Apparent magnitude (V): 12.3
- Constellation: Camelopardalis

Physical characteristics
- Radius: Core: 0.2 ly
- Designations: IC 3568, Perek-Kohoutek 123+34.1 (PK 123+34.1), HD 109540 (central star)

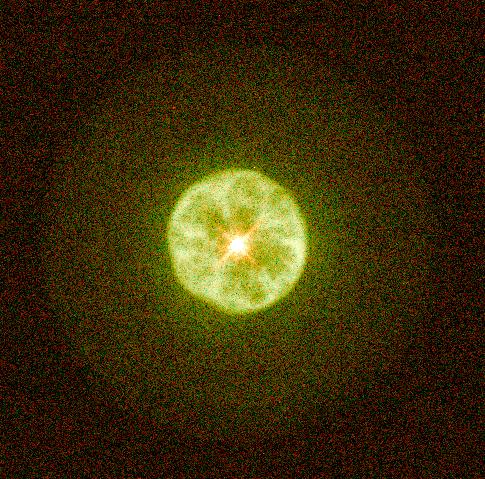
False-colour image of the bright central region of IC 3568. This is the image that gave the nebula its common name.

IC 3568, also known as the Lemon Slice Nebula, Sliced Lemon Nebula, Theoretician's Planetary, or Theoretician's Nebula, is a planetary nebula that is 1.3 kiloparsecs (4500 ly) away from Earth in the constellation of Camelopardalis (just 7.5 degrees from Polaris). It is a relatively young nebula and has a core diameter of only about 0.4 light years. It was dubbed the Lemon Slice Nebula by Jim Kaler, due to its appearance in one false-colour image from the Hubble Space Telescope. The Lemon Slice Nebula is one of the most simple nebulae known, with an almost perfectly spherical morphology. The core of the nebula does not have a distinctly visible structure in formation and is mostly composed of ionized helium. A faint halo of interstellar dust surrounds the nebula.

The central star of the planetary nebula is a magnitude 12.8 O-type star with a spectral type of O(H)3. It is estimated to have a mass less than the Sun, a temperature of over 50,000 K, and a bolometric luminosity of about 2,400 L_{☉}.

IC 3568 was discovered on August 31, 1900 by the American astronomer Robert Grant Aitken while using Lick Observatory's 12" Clark refractor to observe comet Borrelly-Brooks. He noticed that the "star" BD+83°357 in Camelopardalis was actually a small nebula. He used the observatory's 36" refractor the next night to confirm that this was a round nebula. IC 3568 was mistakenly classified as a compact galaxy in the Uppsala General Catalogue, as UGC 7731.

== See also ==
- NGC 40 (the Bow-Tie Nebula in Cepheus)
