= Riemann (crater) =

Crater on the Moon

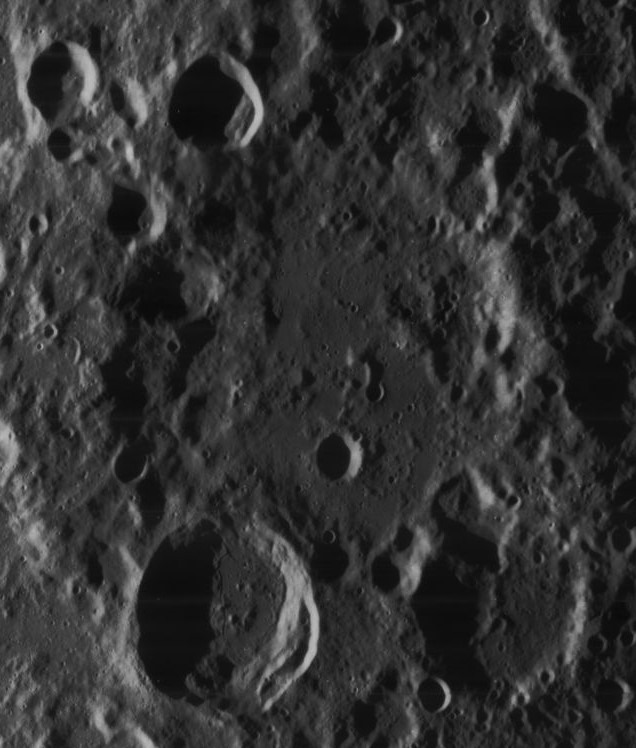
- Oblique Lunar Orbiter 4 image centered on Riemann with Beals at lower left
- Coordinates: 39.5°N 87.2°E
- Diameter: 110 km
- Depth: Unknown
- Colongitude: 274° at sunrise
- Eponym: G. F. Bernhard Riemann

Riemann (pronounced REE mahn) is a lunar impact crater that is located near the northeastern limb of the Moon, and can just be observed edge-on when libration effects bring it into sight. It lies to the east-northeast of the large walled plain called Gauss. To the southeast, beyond sight on the far side, is the crater Vestine.

This is a heavily battered and eroded formation that is only a remnant of its former self. The outer rim has been worn away in many places, and now forms an irregular series of ridges in a rough circle. The rim is overlain along the south-southwestern rim by Beals, and several smaller craters lie along the western and southeast rim. The most intact portion of the outer wall is along the eastern edge.

The interior floor is a mixture of level terrain mixed with rough ground where impacts have stirred up the surface. It is generally less rough in the eastern half, especially near the center. A small, bowl-shaped crater lies on the floor in the southeastern part of the interior, and the faint remnants of several other lesser craters can be observed in the surface.

This crater is named after German mathematician G. F. Bernhard Riemann (1826–1866).

== Satellite craters ==
By convention these features are identified on lunar maps by placing the letter on the side of the crater midpoint that is closest to Riemann.

Riemann	Latitude	Longitude	Diameter
B	41.6° N	85.2° E	24 km
J	37.4° N	90.2° E	39 km

The following crater has been renamed by the IAU.

- Riemann A — See Beals (crater).
