= Ring Nebula =

Planetary nebula in Lyra

Emission nebula
- Planetary nebula
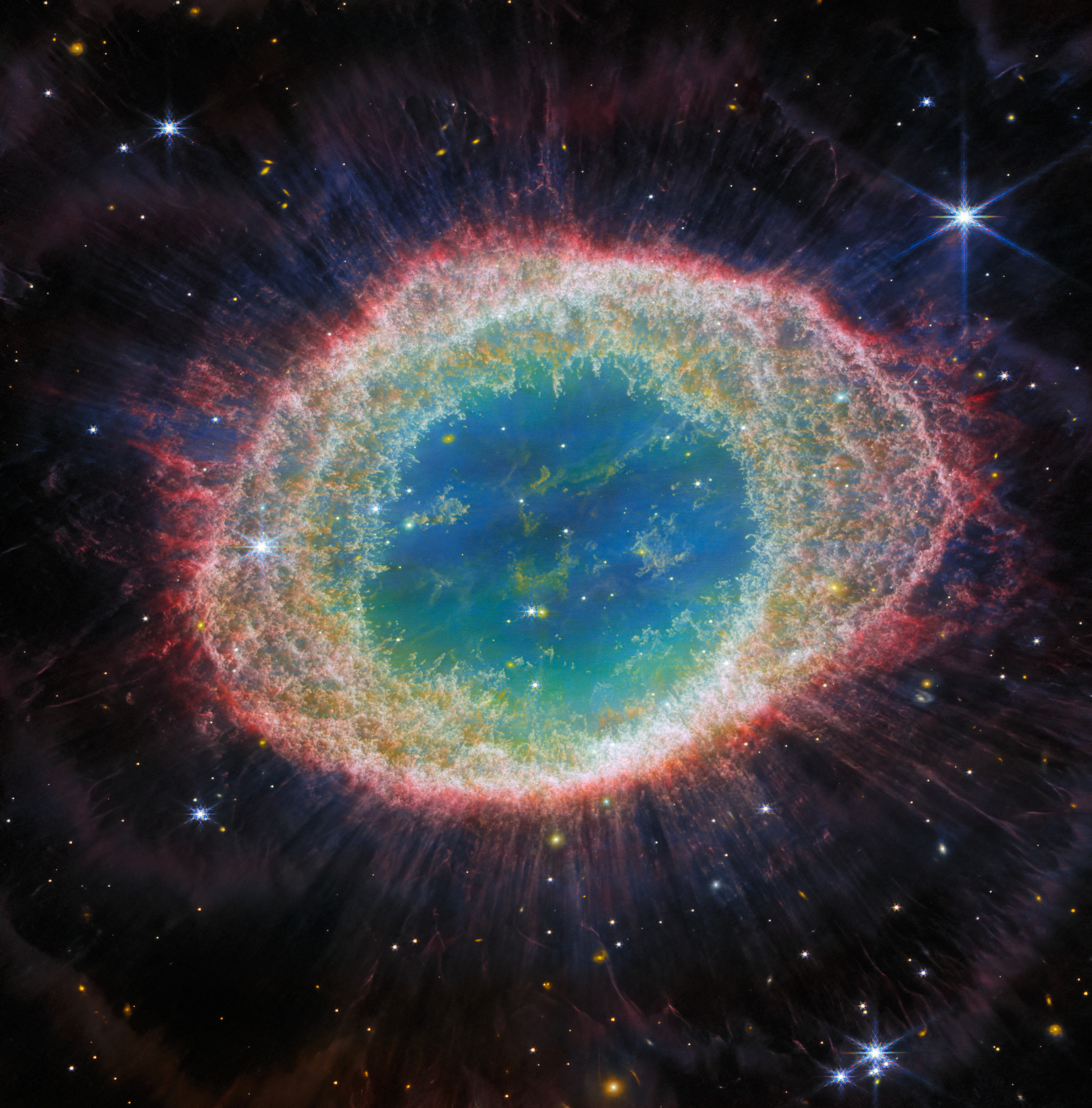
- The Ring Nebula as seen in infrared and visible light by a multiple exposure of images from the James Webb Space Telescope's NIRCam, showing an outer layer of hydrogen that is very faint in visible light

Observation data: J2000 epoch
- Right ascension: 18^{h} 53^{m} 35.097^{s}
- Declination: +33° 01′ 44.88″
- Distance: 2,570±90 ly (790±30 pc)
- Apparent magnitude (V): 8.8
- Apparent dimensions (V): 58.8″ × 84″
- Constellation: Lyra

Physical characteristics
- Radius: 0.1 × 0.14 pc
- Absolute magnitude (V): −0.2+0.7 −1.8^{[b]}
- Designations: M 57, NGC 6720, GC 4447.

The Ring Nebula is a planetary nebula in the northern constellation of Lyra, about mid-way between the prominent stars Beta and Gamma Lyrae. It is also catalogued as Messier 57, M57 and NGC 6720. The nebula was discovered by Charles Messier in 1779. It has an apparent visual magnitude of 8.8, which is too faint to be visible with the naked eye, but it can be readily observed with a small telescope.

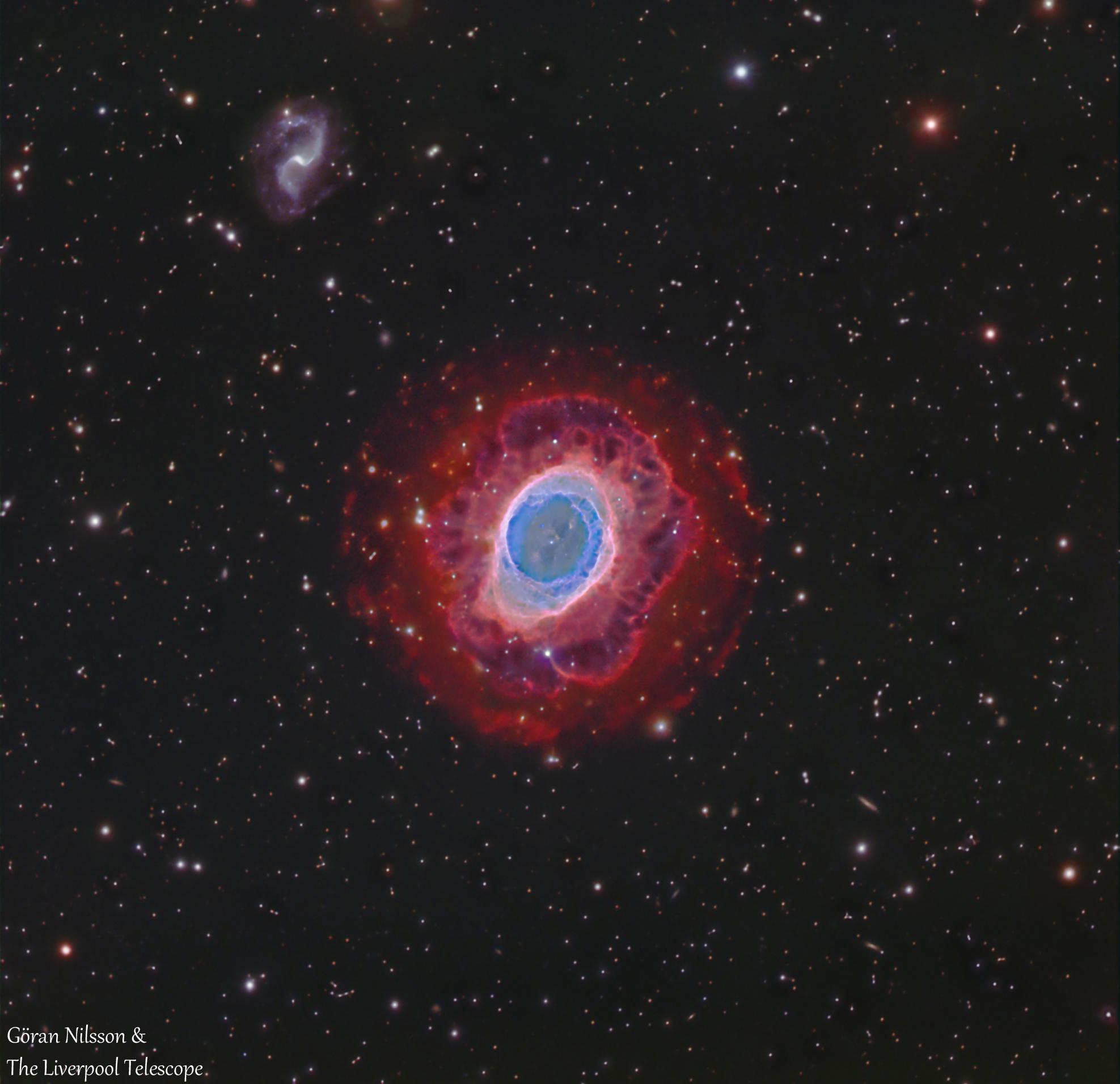
HaRGB image of the Ring Nebula (M57) showing the faint outer shells. The spiral galaxy IC 1296 can also be seen in the top left. Data from the Liverpool Telescope on La Palma, Islas Canarias (Canary Islands), Spain.

A planetary nebula is formed when a star, during the last stages of its evolution before becoming a white dwarf, expels a vast luminous envelope of ionized gas into the surrounding interstellar space. The progenitor star for the ring nebula is now a carbon-oxygen white dwarf with an apparent visual magnitude of +15.75. Based on parallax measurements, this star is located at a distance of approximately 2,570 light-years (790 pc) from the Sun. After expanding for 1,610 years, the nebula currently has a diameter of 1 ly.

== History ==
This nebula was discovered by the French astronomer Charles Messier while searching for comets in late January 1779. Messier's report of his independent discovery of Comet Bode reached fellow French astronomer Antoine Darquier de Pellepoix two weeks later, who then independently rediscovered the nebula while following the comet. Darquier later reported that it was "...as large as Jupiter and resembles a planet which is fading" (which may have contributed to the use of the persistent "planetary nebula" terminology). It would be entered into Messier's catalogue as the 57th object. Messier and German-born astronomer William Herschel speculated that the nebula was formed by multiple faint stars that were unresolvable with his telescope.

In 1800, German Count Friedrich von Hahn announced that he had discovered the faint central star at the heart of the nebula a few years earlier. He also noted that the interior of the ring had undergone changes, and said he could no longer find the central star. In 1864, English amateur astronomer William Huggins examined the spectra of multiple nebulae, discovering that some of these objects, including M57, displayed the spectra of bright emission lines characteristic of fluorescing glowing gases. Huggins concluded that most planetary nebulae were not composed of unresolved stars, as had been previously suspected, but were nebulosities. The nebula was first photographed by the Hungarian astronomer Eugene von Gothard in 1886.

== Observation ==
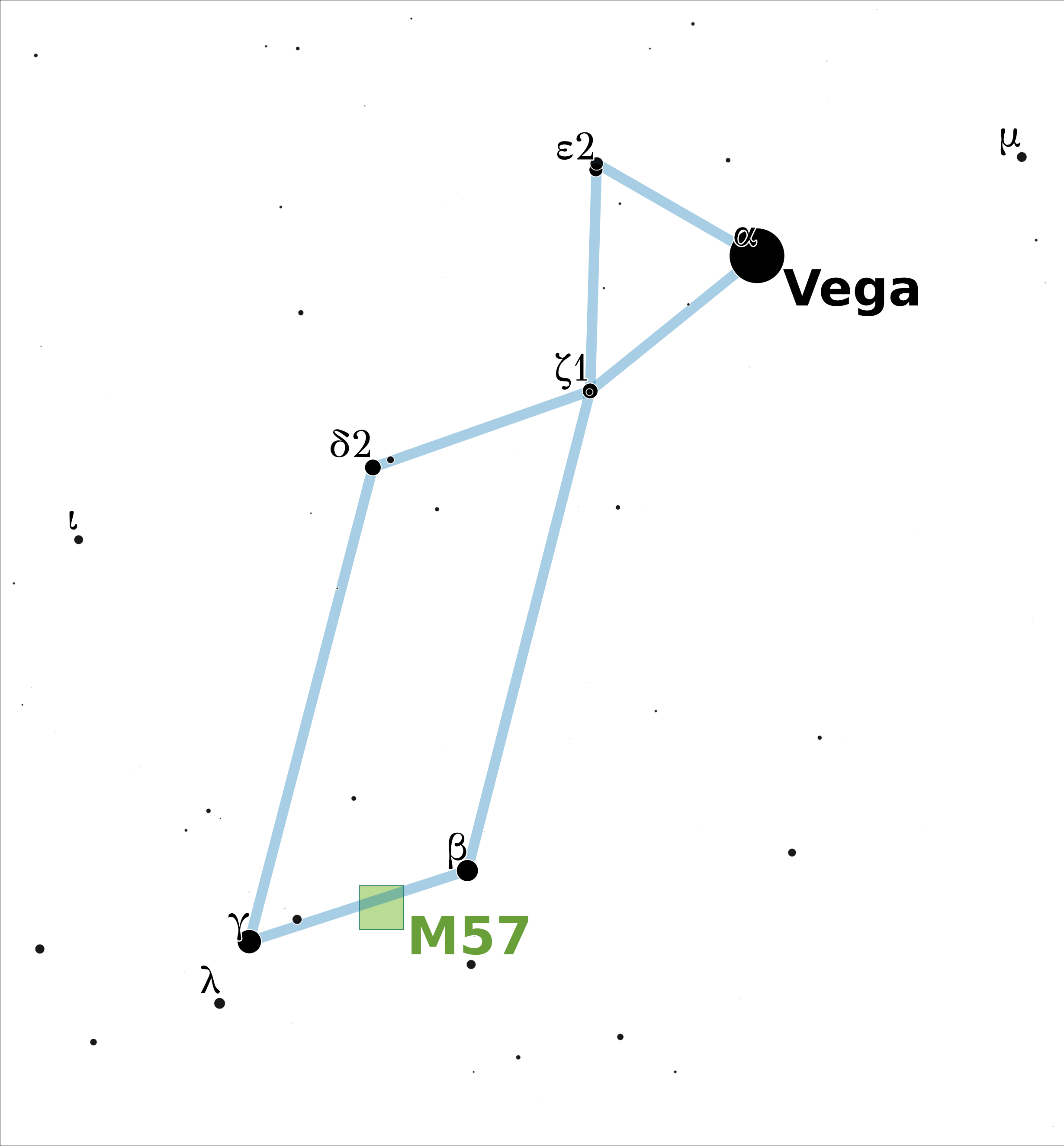
Location of the Ring Nebula in the constellation Lyra

M57 is found south of the bright star Vega, which forms the northwestern vertex of the Summer Triangle asterism. The nebula lies about 40% of the distance from Beta (β) to Gamma (γ) Lyrae, making it an easy target for amateur astronomers to find.

The nebula disk has an angular size of 1.5 × 1 arcminutes, making it too small to be resolved with 10×50 binoculars. It is best observed using a telescope with an aperture of at least 20 cm (8 in), but even a 7.5 cm (3 in) telescope will reveal its elliptical ring shape. Using a UHC or OIII filter greatly enhances visual observation, particularly in light polluted areas. The interior hole can be resolved by a 10 cm (4 in) instrument at a magnification of 100×. Larger instruments will show a few darker zones on the eastern and western edges of the ring and some faint nebulosity inside the disk. The central star, at magnitude 14.8, is difficult to spot.

==== Morphological studies ====
In 1970, C. T. Hua and R. Louise published a morphological and kinematical study of NGC 6720 based on narrow-band interference-filter photographs obtained in Hα (6563 Å) and [N II] (6584 Å). Their observations revealed significant differences between the nebula's appearance in the two emission lines, with the [N II] images showing a more sharply defined structure and distinct condensations. They interpreted the apparent ring as the projection of a circular, relatively flat structure, inclined by approximately 44°42′ to the plane of the sky (Hua & Louise, 1970). g Nebula (NGC 6720) in Hα (left) and [N II] (right). Narrow-band photographs by Hua and Louise (1970).]] Hua, C. T. & Louise, R. (1970), Étude morphologique et cinématique de deux nébuleuses planétaires, Astronomy & Astrophysics, 9, 448–452.. This early morphological interpretation was subsequently discussed by Sun Kwok in Cosmic Butterflies: The Colorful Mysteries of Planetary Nebulae (2001, p. 85). Kwok, Sun (2001). Cosmic Butterflies: The Colorful Mysteries of Planetary Nebulae. Cambridge University Press, p. 85. ISBN 0-521-79135-9.

== Properties ==
M57 is 0.787 kpc (2,570 light-years) from Earth. It has a visual magnitude of 8.8. Photographs taken over a period of 50 years show the rate of nebula expansion is roughly 1 arcsecond per century. Spectroscopic observations show that the expansion velocity along the line of sight is 20–30 km/s. M57 is illuminated by a central white dwarf with an apparent magnitude of 15.75.

The interior parts of this nebula have a blue-green tinge that is caused by the doubly ionized oxygen emission lines at 495.7 and 500.7 nm. These emission lines are so-called "forbidden lines" which occur only in regions of very low density containing no more than a few thousand atoms per cubic centimeter. In the outer region of the ring, part of the reddish hue is caused by hydrogen emission at 656.3 nm, forming part of the Balmer series of lines. Forbidden lines of ionized nitrogen or N II contribute to the reddishness at 654.8 and 658.3 nm.

=== Nebula structure ===
The Ring Nebula (NGC 6720) in Hα (left) and [N II] (right). Narrow-band observations by C. T. Hua and R. Louise (1970).

M57 is thought to be a prolate spheroid with strong concentrations of material along its equator. From Earth, the symmetrical axis is viewed at about 30°. Overall, the observed nebulosity has been estimated to be expanding for approximately 1,610 ± 240 years.

The outer structure of the Ring Nebula (NGC 6720) in Hα (left) and [N II] (right), showing the faint extended emission surrounding the bright inner ring.

Isophotes of NGC 6720 in [N II] (left), and comparison of the theoretical curve with the observational data (right). Hua & Louise (1970), Fig. 2 and Fig. 3. NGC 6720 (Ring Nebula). Four complementary views showing the outer haloes and the main ring structure in different representations.

=== Central star ===
The central star was discovered by Hungarian astronomer Jenő Gothard on September 1, 1886, from images taken at his observatory in Herény, near Szombathely. Within the last two thousand years, the central star of the Ring Nebula has left the asymptotic giant branch. It no longer produces its energy through nuclear fusion and, in evolutionary terms, it is now becoming a compact white dwarf star.

The central star now consists primarily of carbon and oxygen with a thin outer envelope composed of lighter elements. Its mass is about 0.61–0.62 M_{☉}, with a surface temperature of 125,000±5,000 K. Currently it is about 300 times more luminous than the Sun, but its apparent magnitude is only +15.75.

In 2025 JWST observed a dust disk around the central star.

== See also ==
- List of planetary nebulae
- Messier object
- New General Catalogue
- List of Messier objects
- NGC 6565, which is undergoing a similar process and is of the same type

== Notes ==
1. Radius = distance × sin(angular size / 2) = 2.3+1.5
  −0.7 kly * sin(230″ / 2) = 1.3+0.8
  −0.4 ly
2. 8.8 apparent magnitude − 5 × (log_{10}(700+450
  −200 pc distance / 10 pc)) = −0.2+0.7
  −1.8 absolute magnitude
