= Berosus (crater) =

Lunar impact crater

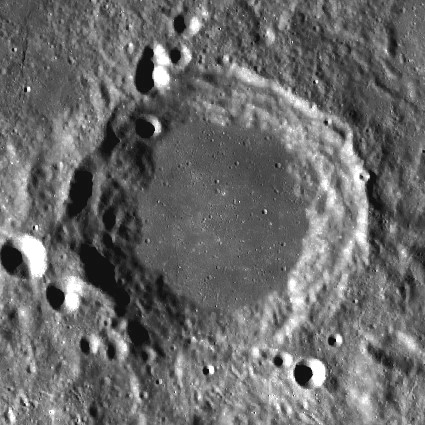
- LRO image
- Coordinates: 33.5°N 69.9°E
- Diameter: 75.24 km (46.75 mi)
- Depth: 3.6 km (2.2 mi)
- Colongitude: 293° at sunrise
- Formation: Nectarian
- Eponym: Berosus of Chaldea

Berosus is a lunar impact crater that is located in the northeast part of the Moon, less than one crater diameter northwest of Hahn. Further to the east-northeast is a large walled plain named Gauss, and to the north-northwest lies Bernoulli crater. Because of its location, this crater appears foreshortened when viewed from the Earth.

This formation dates to the Nectarian period of the lunar geologic timescale. The rim of this crater is roughly circular, but with some angularity along the eastern edge. The southern end of the crater has been heavily eroded, and there are some tiny craterlets along the northern rim. The inner walls have some terracing along the east and northwestern sides. The interior floor of Berosus has been flooded by basalt, and so is level and nearly featureless.

This crater is named after the Babylonian astronomer Berosus of Chaldea (unkn–c. 250 B.C.). The name was incorporated into lunar nomenclature by Italian astronomer Giovanni Riccioli in 1651, but he applied it to the crater now called Hahn. That was later changed by German astronomer Johann Mädler. Its designation was formally adopted by the International Astronomical Union in 1935.

== Satellite craters ==
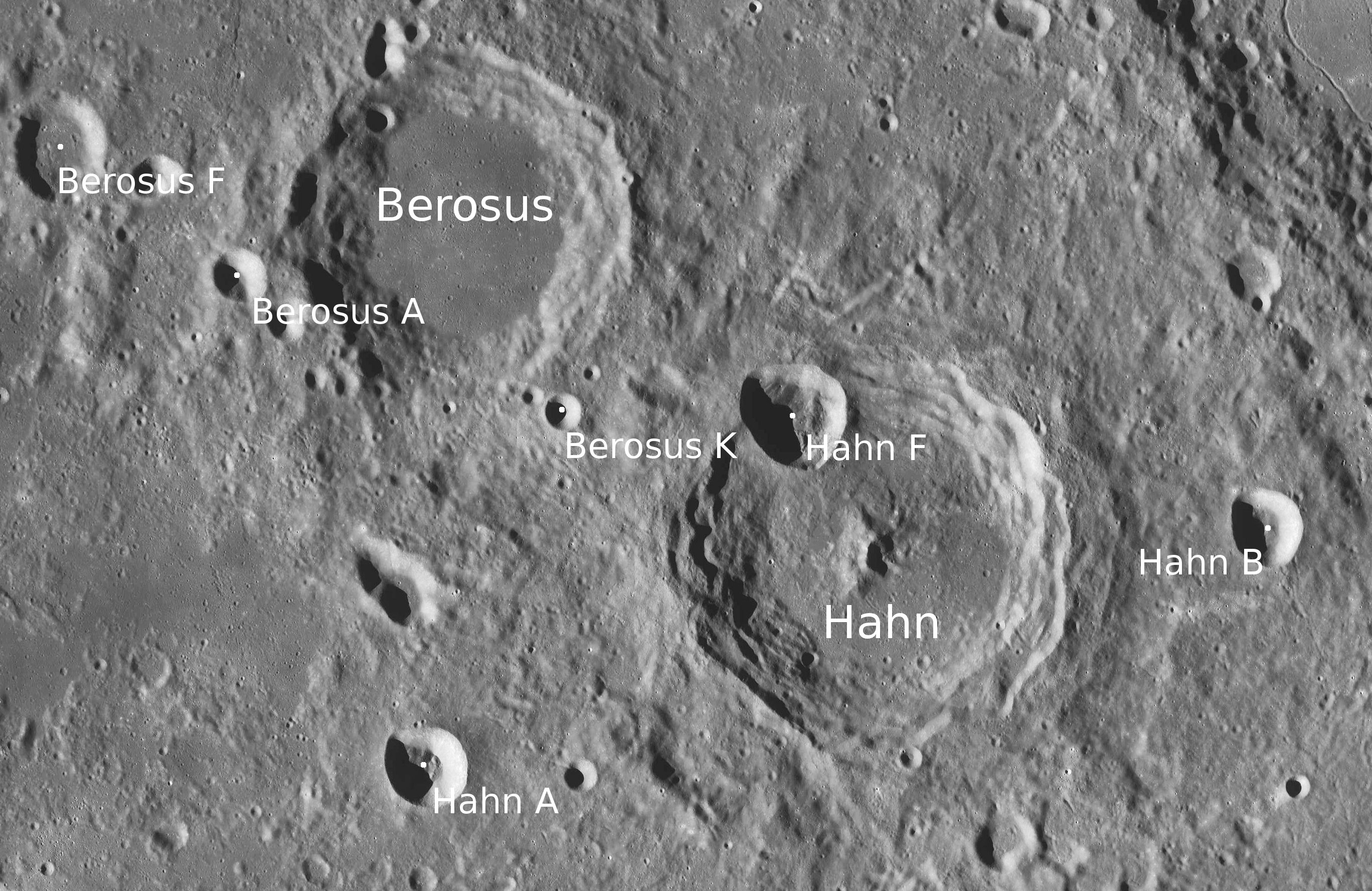
Satellite craters of Berosus

By convention these features are identified on lunar maps by placing the letter on the side of the crater midpoint that is closest to Berosus.

Berosus	Latitude	Longitude	Diameter
A	33.1° N	68.1° E	12 km
F	34.0° N	66.6° E	22 km
K	32.1° N	70.9° E	6 km

== Gallery ==
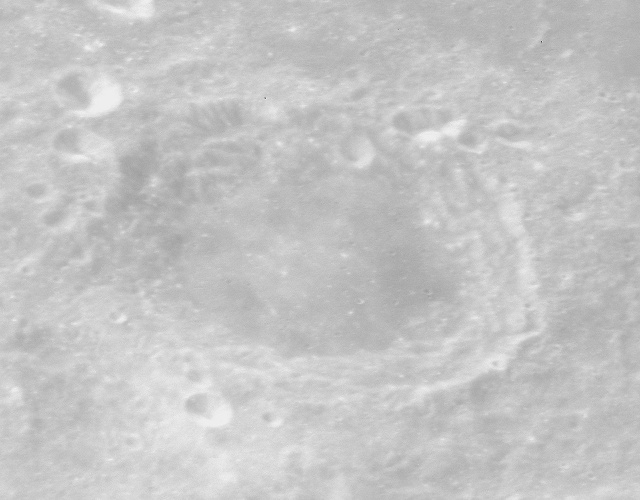
Oblique view from Apollo 16

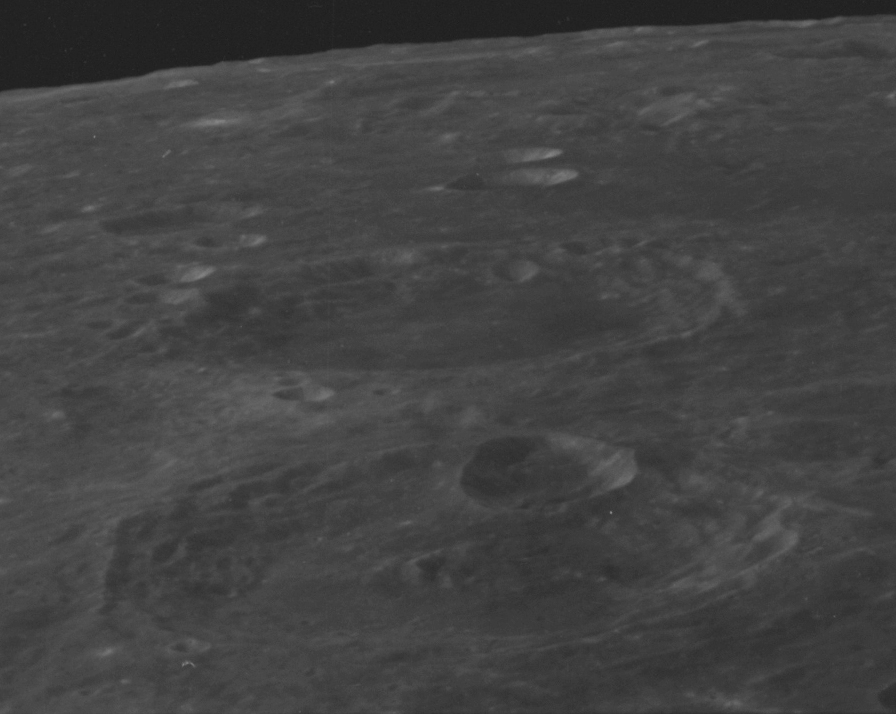
Oblique view from Apollo 14, with Hahn crater in foreground and Berosus behind it.
