= Planetary nebula =

Type of emission nebula created by dying red giants

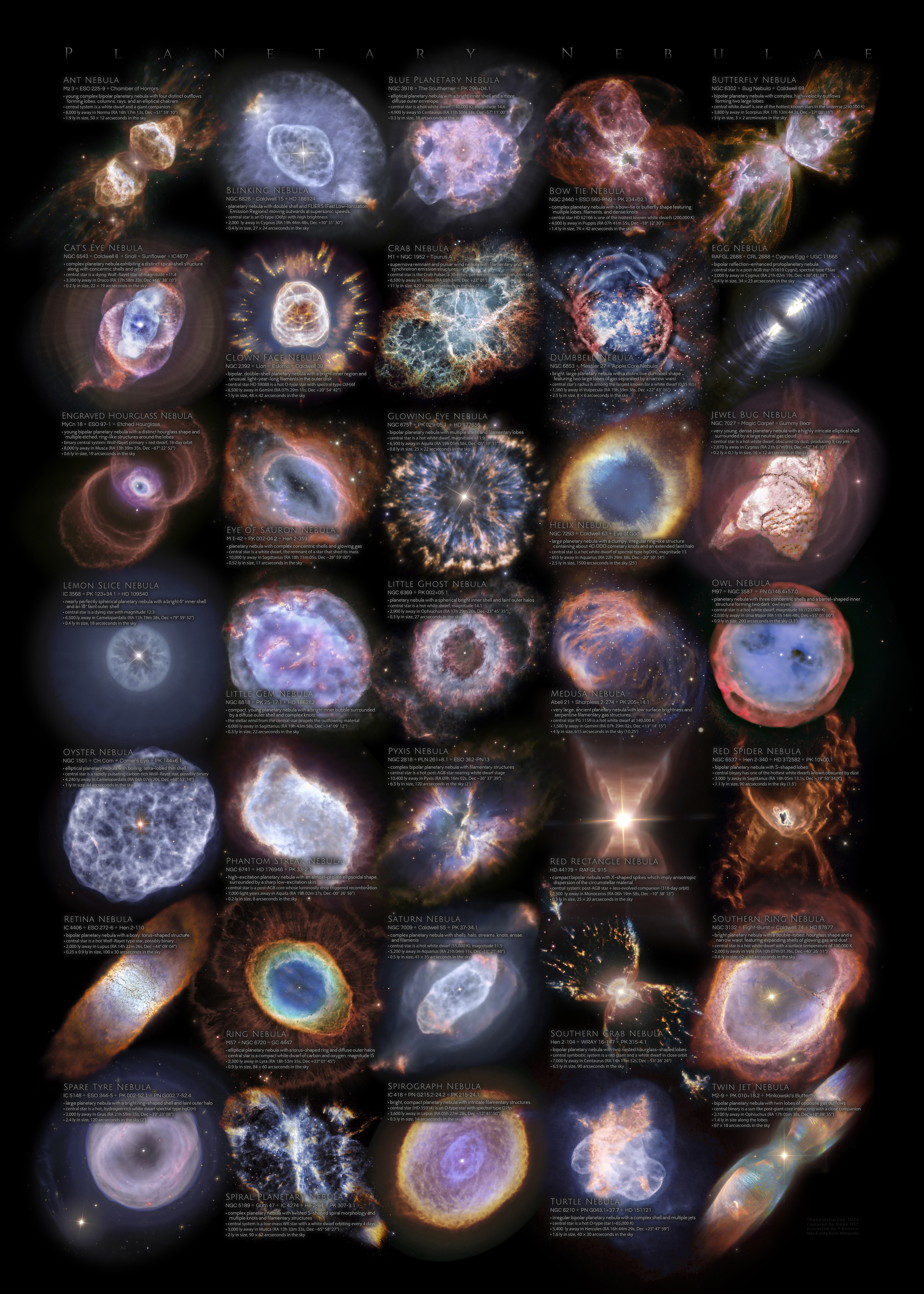
- Some famous nebulae, some of them are planetary nebulae.

Characteristics
- Type: Emission nebula
- Mass range: 0.1 M_{☉}-1 M_{☉}
- Size range: ~1 ly
- Density: 100 to 10,000 particles per cm^{3}

External links
- Media category
- Q13632

Additional Information
- Discovered: 1764, Charles Messier

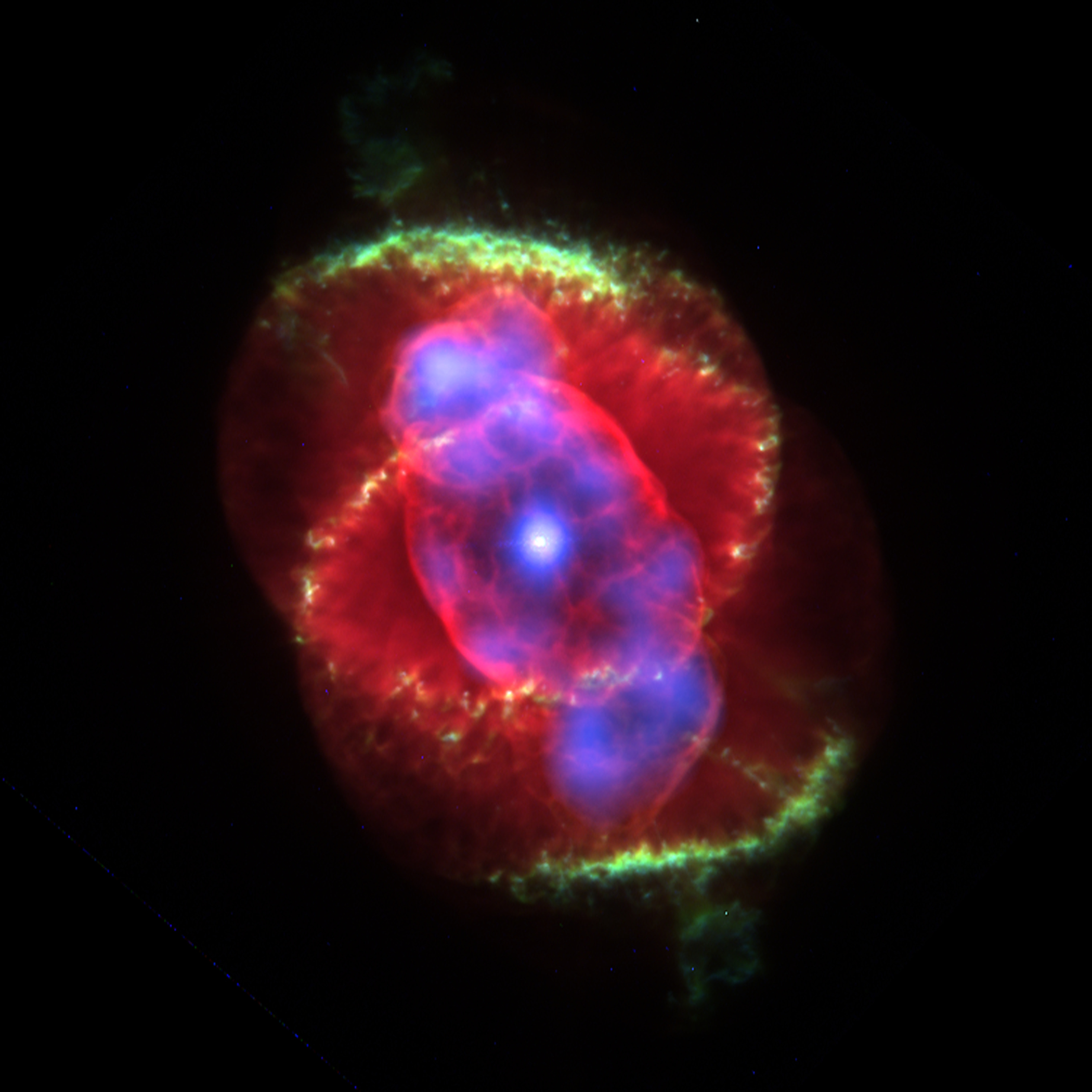
X-ray/optical composite image of the Cat's Eye Nebula (NGC 6543)

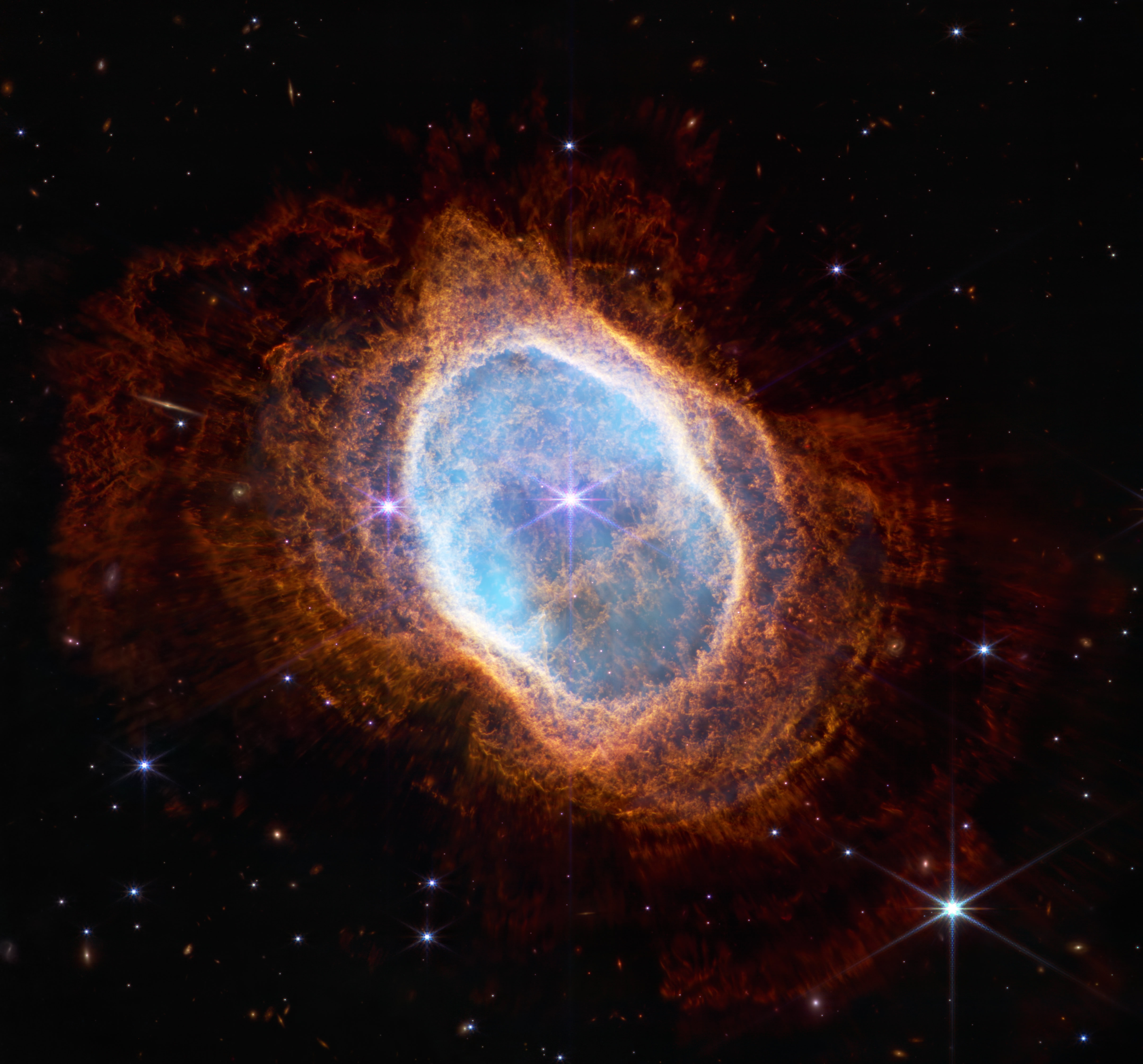
Two cameras aboard Webb Telescope captured the latest image of this planetary nebula, cataloged as NGC 3132, and known informally as the Southern Ring Nebula. It is approximately 2,500 light-years away.

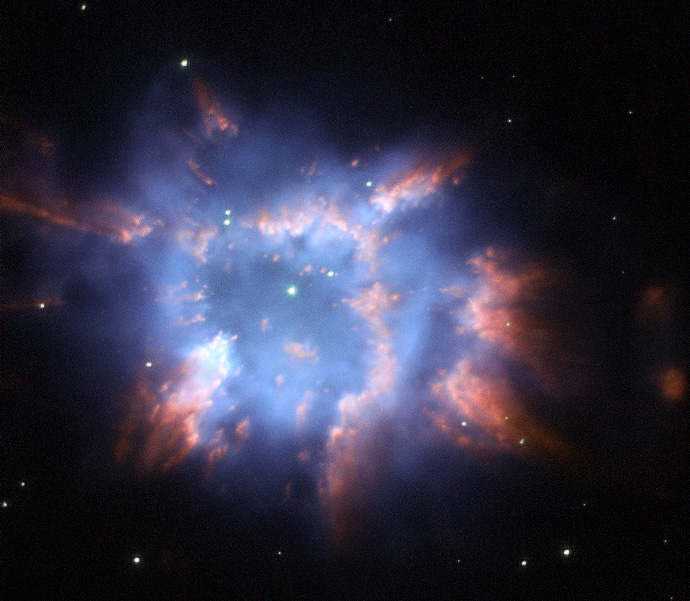
NGC 6326, a planetary nebula with glowing wisps of outpouring gas that are lit up by a binary central star

A planetary nebula is a type of emission nebula consisting of an expanding, glowing shell of ionized gas (Note: While most astrophysicists refer to the material in the shell as a gas, some use the term plasma instead.) ejected from red giant stars late in their lives.

"Planetary" describes their planet-like round shape as observed through early telescopes, but they are unrelated to planets. As early as the 1780s, the English astronomer William Herschel described them as resembling planets; in January 1779, the French astronomer Antoine Darquier de Pellepoix had described the Ring Nebula as "very dim but perfectly outlined; it is as large as Jupiter and resembles a fading planet".

All planetary nebulae form at the end of the life of a star of intermediate mass, about 1-8 solar masses. It is expected that the Sun will form a planetary nebula at the end of its life cycle. They are relatively short-lived phenomena, lasting perhaps a few tens of millennia, compared to considerably longer phases of stellar evolution. Once all of the red giant's atmosphere has been dissipated, energetic ultraviolet radiation from the exposed hot luminous core, called a planetary nebula nucleus (P.N.N.), ionizes the ejected material. Absorbed ultraviolet light then energizes the shell of nebulous gas around the central star, causing it to appear as a brightly colored planetary nebula.

Planetary nebulae probably play a crucial role in the chemical evolution of the Milky Way by expelling elements into the interstellar medium from stars where those elements were created. Planetary nebulae are observed in more distant galaxies, yielding useful information about their chemical abundances.

Starting in the 1990s, Hubble Space Telescope images revealed that many planetary nebulae have extremely complex and varied morphologies. About one-fifth are roughly spherical, but the majority are not spherically symmetric. The mechanisms that produce such a wide variety of shapes and features are not yet well understood, but binary central stars, stellar winds and magnetic fields may play a role.

== Observations ==
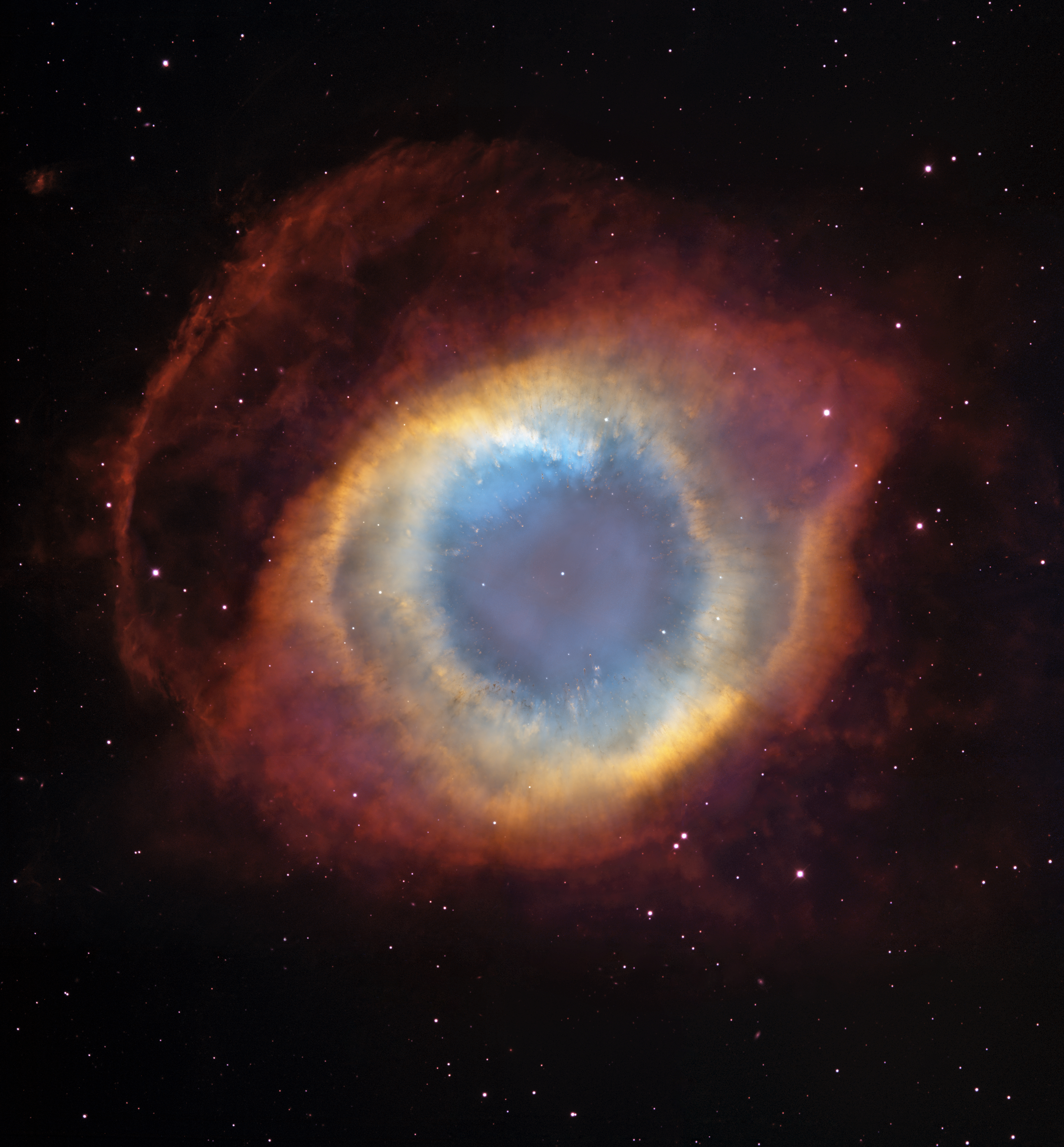
NGC 7293, the Helix Nebula

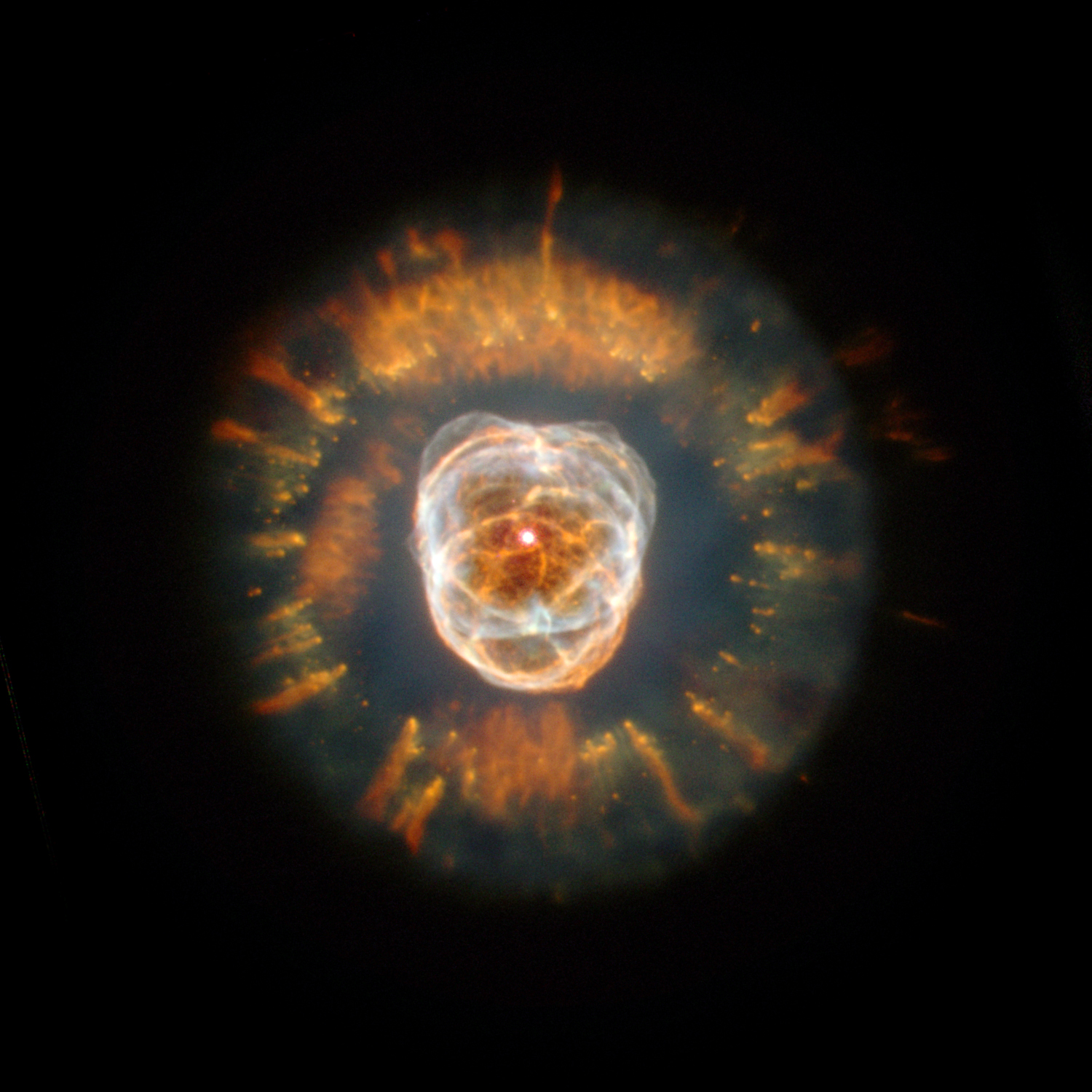
NGC 2392, the Eskimo Nebula

=== Discovery ===
The first planetary nebula discovered (though not yet termed as such) was the Dumbbell Nebula in the constellation of Vulpecula. It was observed by Charles Messier on July 12, 1764, and listed as M27 in his catalogue of nebulous objects. To early observers with low-resolution telescopes, M27 and subsequently discovered planetary nebulae resembled the giant planets like Uranus. As early as January 1779, the French astronomer Antoine Darquier de Pellepoix described in his observations of the Ring Nebula, "a very dull nebula, but perfectly outlined; as large as Jupiter and looks like a fading planet".

The nature of these objects remained unclear. In 1782, William Herschel, discoverer of Uranus, found the Saturn Nebula (NGC 7009) and described it as "A curious nebula, or what else to call it I do not know". He later described these objects as seeming to be planets "of the starry kind". As noted by Darquier before him, Herschel found that the disk resembled a planet, but it was too faint to be one. In 1785, Herschel wrote to Jérôme Lalande:

These are celestial bodies of which as yet we have no clear idea and which are perhaps of a type quite different from those that we are familiar with in the heavens. I have already found four that have a visible diameter of between 15 and 30 seconds. These bodies appear to have a disk that is rather like a planet, that is to say, of equal brightness all over, round or somewhat oval, and about as well defined in outline as the disk of the planets, of a light strong enough to be visible with an ordinary telescope of only one foot, yet they have only the appearance of a star of about ninth magnitude.

He assigned these to Class IV of his catalogue of "nebulae", eventually listing 78 "planetary nebulae", most of which are in fact galaxies.

Herschel used the term "planetary nebulae" for these objects. The origin of this term is not known. The label "planetary nebula" became ingrained in the terminology used by astronomers to categorize these types of nebulae, and is still in use by astronomers today.

=== Spectra ===
The nature of planetary nebulae remained unknown until the first spectroscopic observations were made in the mid-19th century. Using a prism to disperse their light, William Huggins was one of the earliest astronomers to study the optical spectra of astronomical objects.

On August 29, 1864, Huggins was the first to analyze the spectrum of a planetary nebula when he observed Cat's Eye Nebula. His observations of stars had shown that their spectra consisted of a continuum of radiation with many dark lines superimposed. He found that many nebulous objects, such as the Andromeda Nebula (as it was then known), had spectra that were quite similar. However, when Huggins looked at the Cat's Eye Nebula, he found a very different spectrum. Rather than a strong continuum with absorption lines superimposed, the Cat's Eye Nebula and other similar objects showed a number of emission lines. The brightest of these was at a wavelength of 500.7 nanometres, which did not correspond with a line of any known element.

At first, it was hypothesized that the line might be due to an unknown element, which was named nebulium. A similar idea had led to the discovery of helium through analysis of the Sun's spectrum in 1868. While helium was isolated on Earth soon after its discovery in the spectrum of the Sun, "nebulium" was not. In the early 20th century, Henry Norris Russell proposed that, rather than being a new element, the line at 500.7 nm was due to a familiar element in unfamiliar conditions.

Physicists showed in the 1920s that in gas at extremely low densities, electrons can occupy excited metastable energy levels in atoms and ions that would otherwise be de-excited by collisions that would occur at higher densities. Electron transitions from these levels in nitrogen and oxygen ions (O^{+}, O^{2+} (a.k.a. O iii), and N^{+}) give rise to the 500.7 nm emission line and others. These spectral lines, which can only be seen in very low-density gases, are called forbidden lines. Spectroscopic observations thus showed that nebulae were made of extremely rarefied gas.

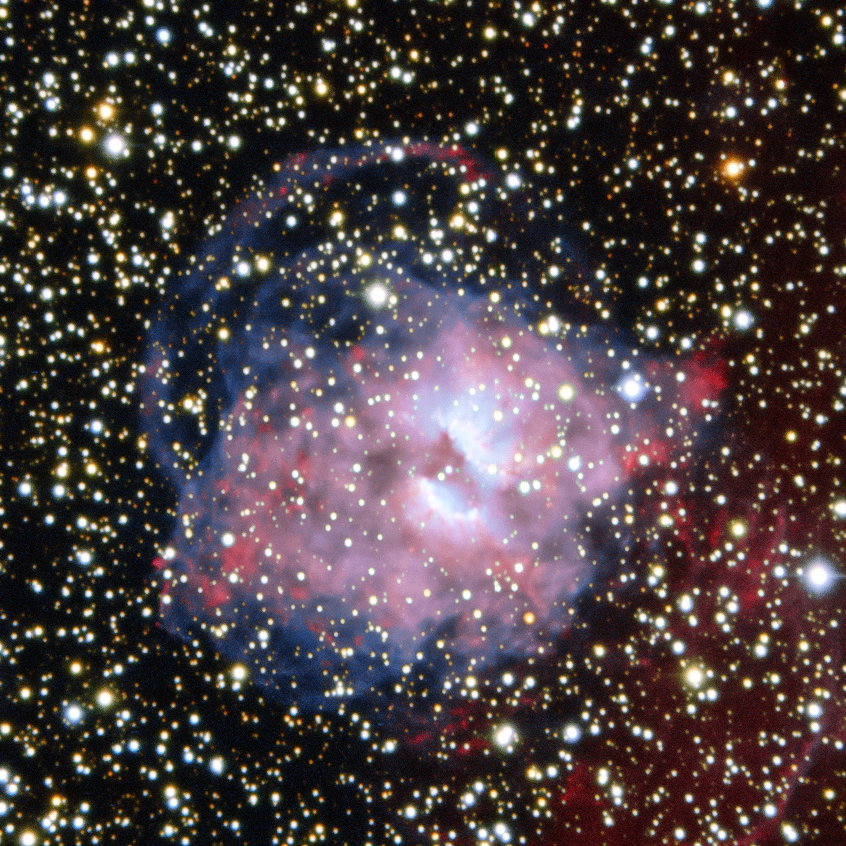
Planetary nebula NGC 3699 is distinguished by an irregular mottled appearance and a dark rift.

=== Central stars ===
The central stars of planetary nebulae are very hot. Only when a star has exhausted most of its nuclear fuel can it collapse to a small size. Planetary nebulae are understood as a final stage of stellar evolution. Spectroscopic observations show that all planetary nebulae are expanding. This led to the idea that planetary nebulae were caused by a star's outer layers being thrown into space at the end of its life.

=== Modern observations ===
Towards the end of the 20th century, technological improvements helped to further the study of planetary nebulae. Space telescopes allowed astronomers to study light wavelengths outside those that the Earth's atmosphere transmits. The first UV observations of PNe (IC 2149) were performed from space, with the Orion 2 Space Observatory (see Orion 1 and Orion 2 Space Observatories) on board the Soyuz 13 spacecraft in December 1973, two photon emission from nebulae was detected for the first time. Infrared and ultraviolet studies of planetary nebulae allowed much more accurate determinations of nebular temperatures, densities and elemental abundances. Charge-coupled device technology allowed much fainter spectral lines to be measured accurately than had previously been possible. The Hubble Space Telescope also showed that while many nebulae appear to have simple and regular structures when observed from the ground, the very high optical resolution achievable by telescopes above the Earth's atmosphere reveals extremely complex structures.

Under the Morgan-Keenan spectral classification scheme, planetary nebulae are classified as Type-P, although this notation is seldom used in practice.

== Origins ==
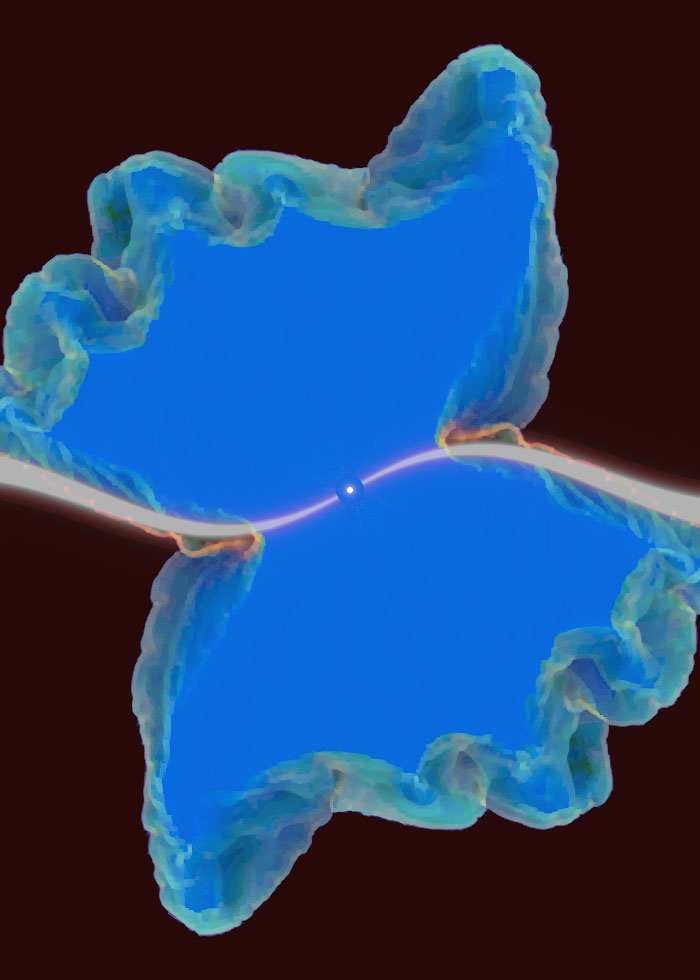
Computer simulation of the formation of a planetary nebula from a star with a warped disk, showing the complexity which can result from a small initial asymmetry

Stars greater than 8 solar masses (M_{☉}) will probably end their lives in dramatic supernovae explosions, while planetary nebulae seemingly only occur at the end of the lives of intermediate and low mass stars between 0.8 M_{☉} to 8.0 M_{☉}. Progenitor stars that form planetary nebulae will spend most of their lifetimes converting their hydrogen into helium in the star's core by nuclear fusion at about 15 million K. This generates energy in the core, which creates outward pressure that balances the crushing inward pressures of gravity. This state of equilibrium is known as the main sequence, which can last for tens of millions to billions of years, depending on the mass.

When the hydrogen in the core starts to run out, nuclear fusion generates less energy and gravity starts compressing the core, causing a rise in temperature to about 100 million K while the hydrogen burning shifts to a thin shell around the core. To maintain thermal equilibrium, the star's outer layers expand and cool. This phase causes a dramatic rise in stellar luminosity, but because the released energy is distributed over a much larger surface area, it in fact causes a decrease of the surface temperature. This phase of stellar evolution is known as the red giant branch (RGB). In stars more massive than 0.8 M_{☉}, the core, now consisting of mostly helium, is ignited again; helium is then converted into carbon and oxygen, slowly consuming the core's helium.

As the helium in the core runs out, the core's temperature starts rising again in a manner similar to the RGB. The luminosity increases again and the star expands once more, decreasing the surface temperature. Stars in this phase of their lives are known as asymptotic giant branch stars (AGB). During this phase, the star can lose 50–70% of its total mass from its stellar wind.

The venting of atmosphere continues unabated into interstellar space. When the outer surface of the exposed core reaches temperatures exceeding about 30,000 K, there are enough emitted ultraviolet photons to ionize the ejected atmosphere, causing the gas to shine as a planetary nebula.

== Lifetime ==
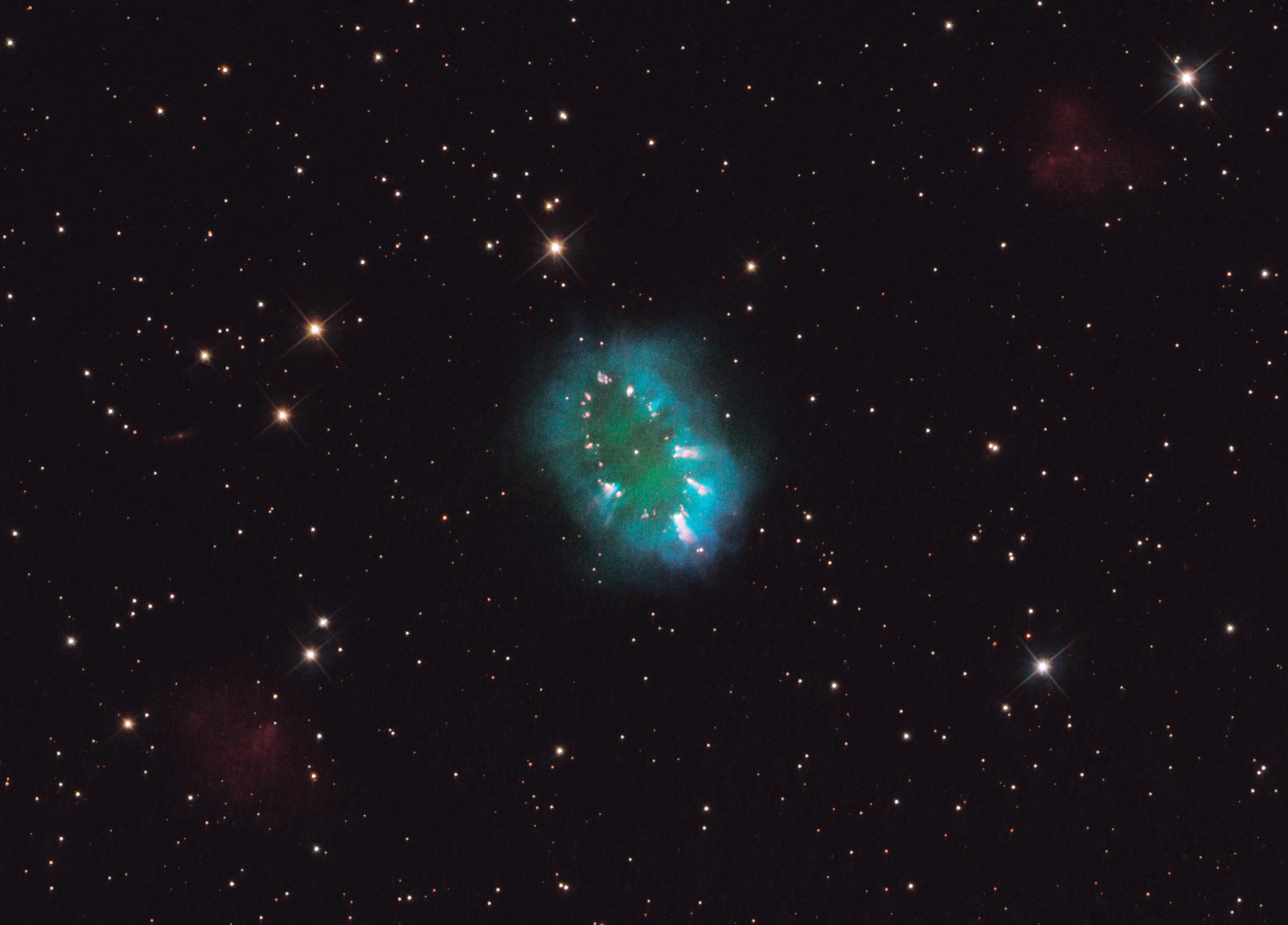
The Necklace Nebula consists of a bright ring, measuring about two light-years across, dotted with dense, bright knots of gas that resemble diamonds in a necklace. The knots glow brightly due to absorption of ultraviolet light from the central stars.

After a star passes through the asymptotic giant branch (AGB) phase, the short planetary nebula phase of stellar evolution begins as gases blow away from the central star at speeds of a few kilometers per second. The central star is the remnant of its AGB progenitor, an electron-degenerate carbon-oxygen core that has lost most of its hydrogen envelope due to mass loss on the AGB. As the gases expand, the central star undergoes a two-stage evolution, first growing hotter as it continues to contract and hydrogen fusion reactions occur in the shell around the core and then slowly cooling when the hydrogen shell is exhausted through fusion and mass loss. In the second phase, it radiates away its energy and fusion reactions cease, as the central star is not heavy enough to generate the core temperatures required for carbon and oxygen to fuse. During the first phase, the central star maintains constant luminosity, while at the same time it grows ever hotter, eventually reaching temperatures around 100,000 K. In the second phase, it cools so much that it does not give off enough ultraviolet radiation to ionize the increasingly distant gas cloud. The star becomes a white dwarf, and the expanding gas cloud becomes invisible to us, ending the planetary nebula phase of evolution. For a typical planetary nebula, about 10,000 years pass between its formation and recombination of the resulting plasma.

== Role in galactic enrichment ==
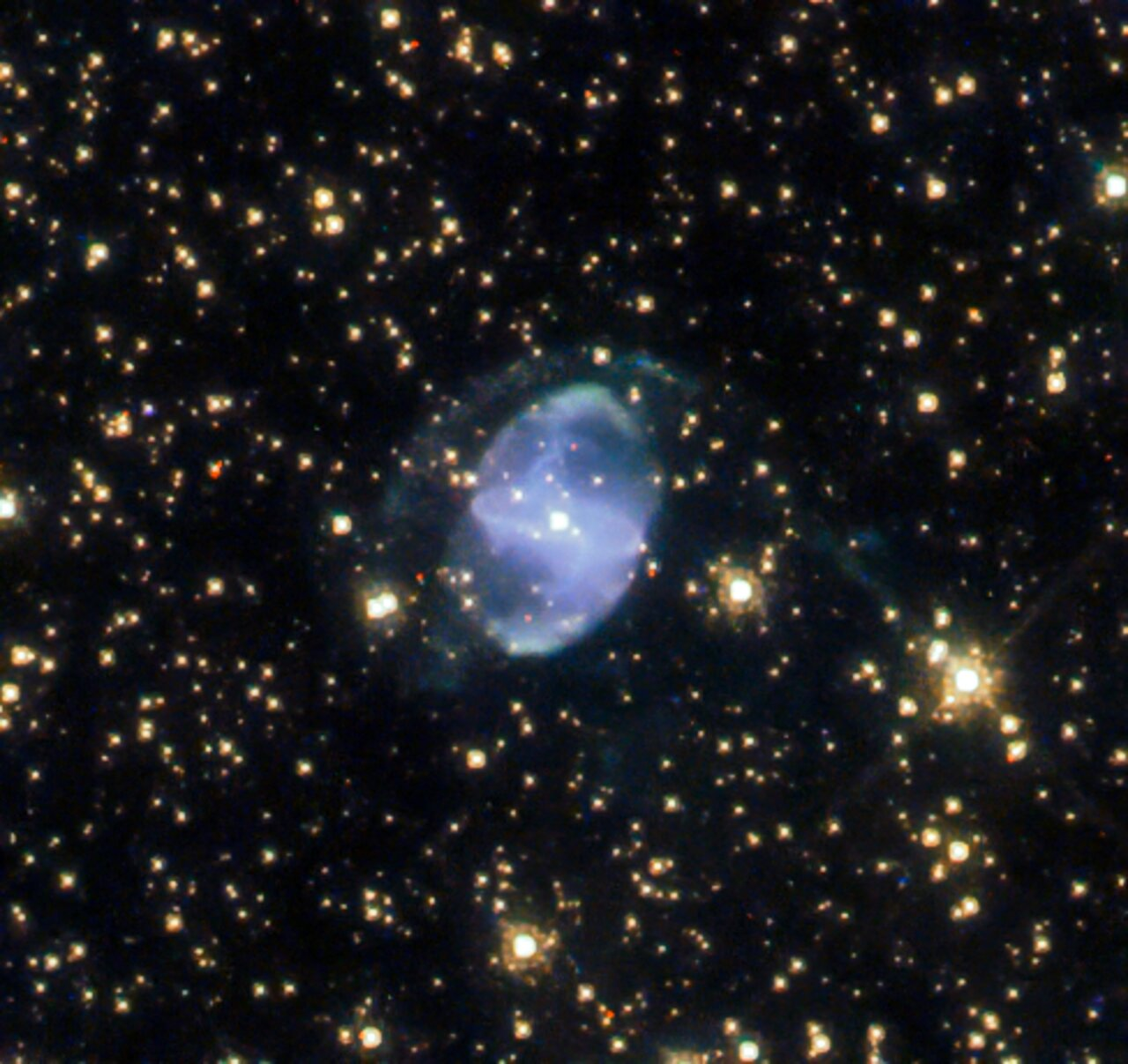
ESO 455-10 is a planetary nebula located in the constellation of Scorpius (The Scorpion).

Planetary nebulae may play a very important role in galactic evolution. Newly born stars consist almost entirely of hydrogen and helium, but as stars evolve through the asymptotic giant branch phase, they create heavier elements via nuclear fusion which are eventually expelled by strong stellar winds. Planetary nebulae usually contain larger proportions of elements such as carbon, nitrogen and oxygen, and these are recycled into the interstellar medium via these powerful winds. In this way, planetary nebulae greatly enrich the Milky Way and their nebulae with these heavier elements – collectively known by astronomers as metals and specifically referred to by the metallicity parameter Z.

Subsequent generations of stars formed from such nebulae also tend to have higher metallicities. Although these metals are present in stars in relatively tiny amounts, they have marked effects on stellar evolution and fusion reactions. When stars formed earlier in the universe they theoretically contained smaller quantities of heavier elements. Known examples are the metal poor Population II stars. (See Stellar population.) Identification of stellar metallicity content is found by spectroscopy.

== Characteristics ==
=== Physical characteristics ===
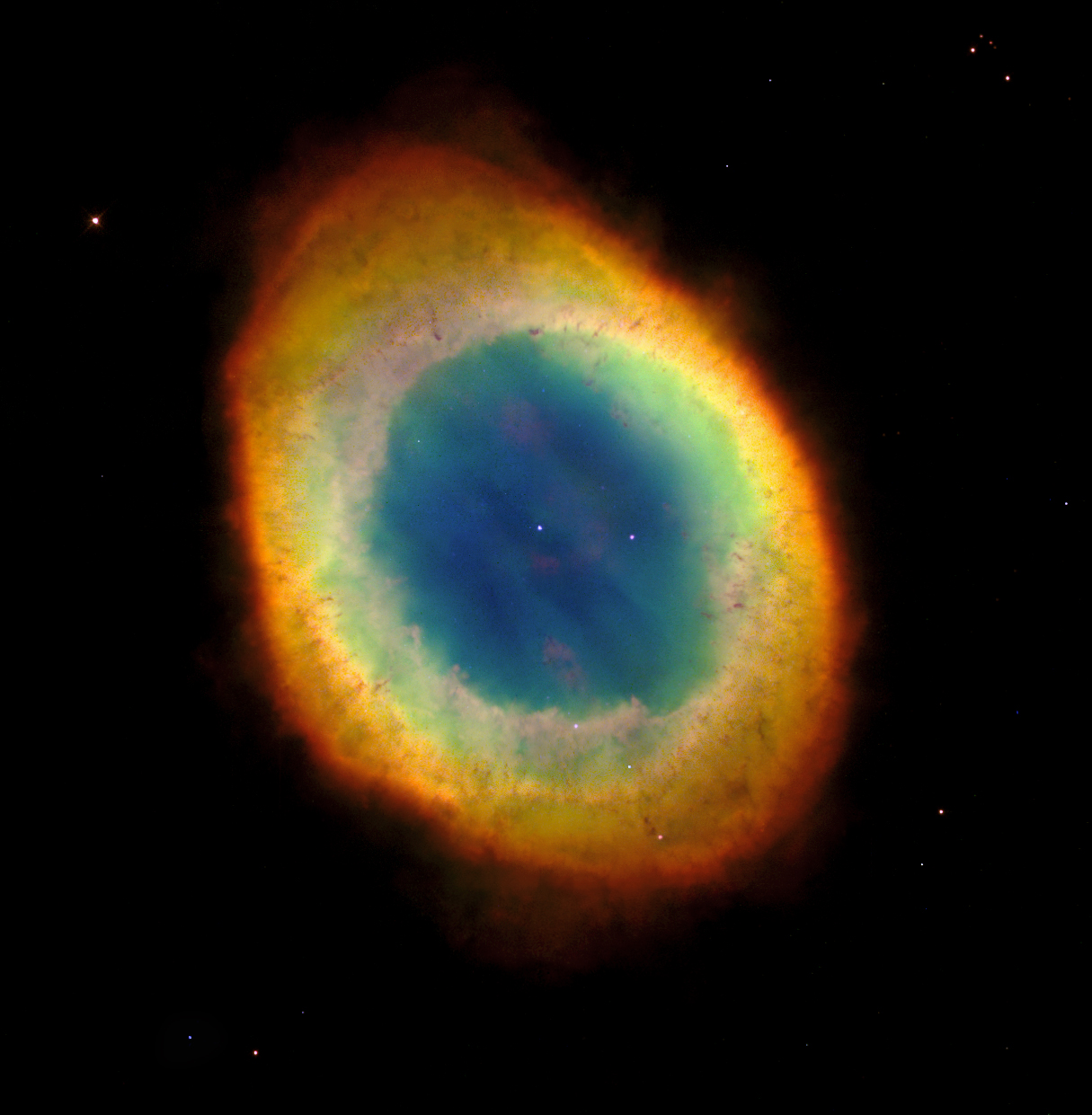
NGC 6720, the Ring Nebula

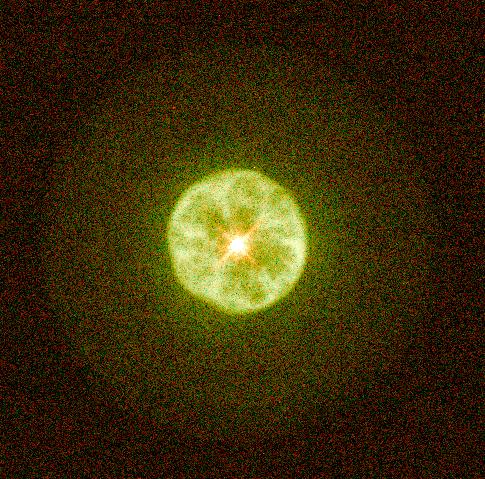
Lemon slice nebula (IC 3568)

A typical planetary nebula is roughly one light year across, and consists of extremely rarefied gas, with a density generally from 100 to 10,000 particles per cm^{3}. (The Earth's atmosphere, by comparison, contains 2.5×10^{19} particles per cm^{3}.) Young planetary nebulae have the highest densities, sometimes as high as 10^{6} particles per cm^{3}. As nebulae age, their expansion causes their density to decrease. The masses of planetary nebulae range from 0.1 to 1 solar masses.

Radiation from the central star heats the gases to temperatures of about 10,000 K. The gas temperature in central regions is usually much higher than at the periphery reaching 16,000–25,000 K. The volume in the vicinity of the central star is often filled with a very hot (coronal) gas having the temperature of about 1,000,000 K. This gas originates from the surface of the central star in the form of the fast stellar wind.

Nebulae may be described as matter bounded or radiation bounded. In the former case, there is not enough matter in the nebula to absorb all the UV photons emitted by the star, and the visible nebula is fully ionized. In the latter case, there are not enough UV photons being emitted by the central star to ionize all the surrounding gas, and an ionization front propagates outward into the circumstellar envelope of neutral atoms.

=== Numbers and distribution ===
About 3000 planetary nebulae are now known to exist in our galaxy, out of 200 billion stars. Their very short lifetime compared to total stellar lifetime accounts for their rarity. They are found mostly near the plane of the Milky Way, with the greatest concentration near the Galactic Center.

=== Morphology ===
This animation shows how the two stars at the heart of a planetary nebula like Fleming 1 can control the creation of the spectacular jets of material ejected from the object.

Only about 20% of planetary nebulae are spherically symmetric (for example, see Abell 39). A wide variety of shapes exist with some very complex forms seen. Planetary nebulae are classified by different authors into: stellar, disk, ring, irregular, helical, bipolar, quadrupolar, and other types, although the majority of them belong to just three types: spherical, elliptical and bipolar. Bipolar nebulae are concentrated in the galactic plane, probably produced by relatively young massive progenitor stars; and bipolars in the galactic bulge appear to prefer orienting their orbital axes parallel to the galactic plane. On the other hand, spherical nebulae are probably produced by old stars similar to the Sun.

The huge variety of the shapes is partially the projection effect—the same nebula when viewed under different angles will appear different. Nevertheless, the reason for the huge variety of physical shapes is not fully understood. Gravitational interactions with companion stars if the central stars are binary stars may be one cause. Another possibility is that planets disrupt the flow of material away from the star as the nebula forms. It has been determined that the more massive stars produce more irregularly shaped nebulae. In January 2005, astronomers announced the first detection of magnetic fields around the central stars of two planetary nebulae, predicted already in the 1960s, and hypothesized that the fields might be partly or wholly responsible for their remarkable shapes. Classification of planetary nebula morphologies depends on observational sensitivity and on the species observed. For example, the waist of a bipolar nebula may be identified as elliptical if the bipolar lobes are too faint to detect. This has been reported for NGC 650–1, Sh 1–89 and SaWe 3 by Hua (A&AS, 125, 355,1997) and Hua et al. (A&AS, 133, 361, 1998).

== Membership in clusters ==
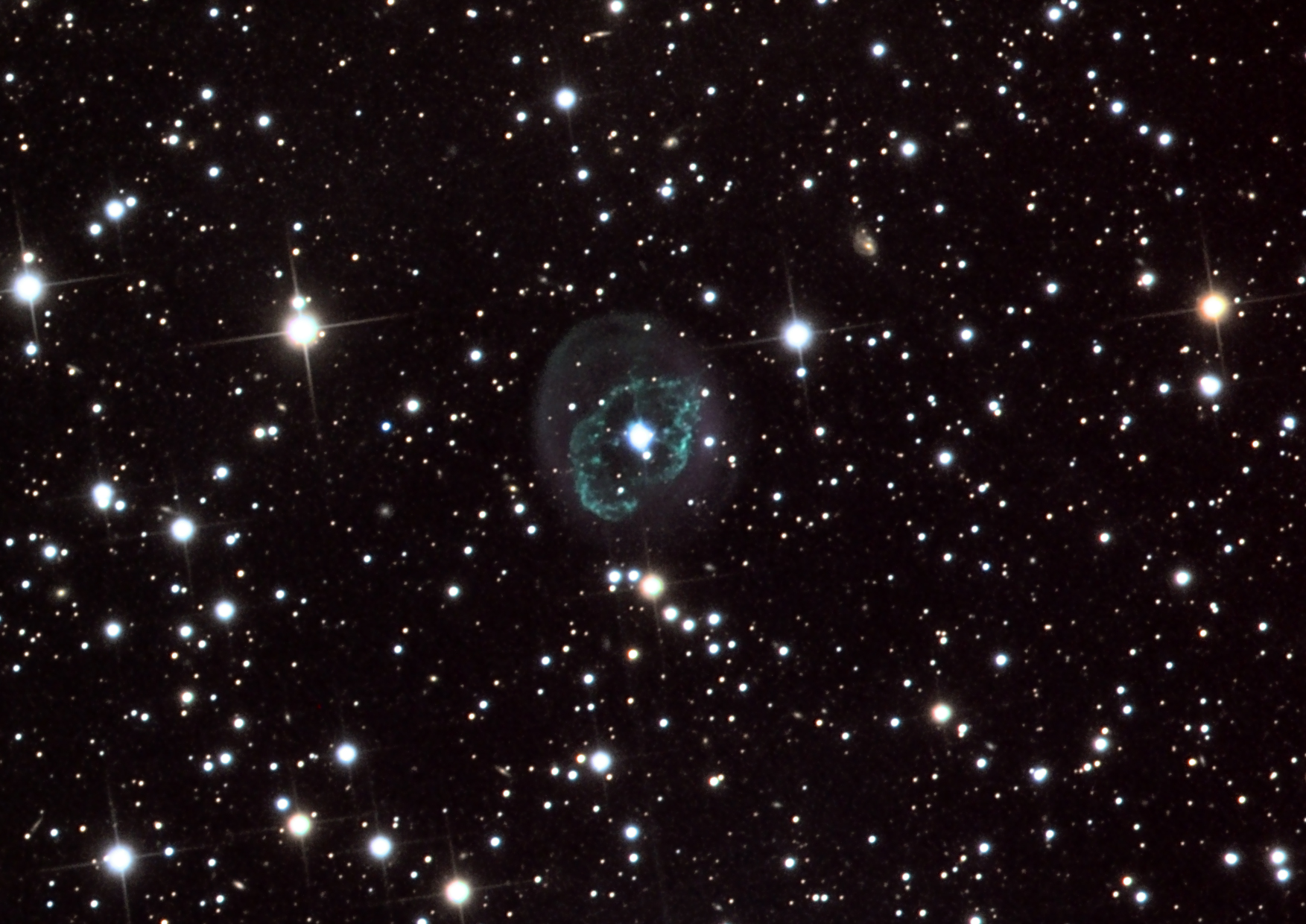
Abell 78, 24 inch telescope on Mt. Lemmon, Arizona.

Planetary nebulae have been detected as members in four Galactic globular clusters: Messier 15, Messier 22, NGC 6441 and Palomar 6. Evidence also points to the potential discovery of planetary nebulae in globular clusters in the galaxy M31. However, there is currently only one case of a planetary nebula discovered in an open cluster that is agreed upon by independent researchers. That case pertains to the planetary nebula PHR 1315-6555 and the open cluster Andrews-Lindsay 1. Indeed, through cluster membership, PHR 1315-6555 possesses among the most precise distances established for a planetary nebula (i.e., a 4% distance solution). The cases of NGC 2818 and NGC 2348 in Messier 46, exhibit mismatched velocities between the planetary nebulae and the clusters, which indicates they are line-of-sight coincidences. A subsample of tentative cases that may potentially be cluster/PN pairs includes Abell 8 and Bica 6, and He 2-86 and NGC 4463.

Theoretical models predict that planetary nebulae can form from main-sequence stars of between one and eight solar masses, which puts the progenitor star's age at greater than 40 million years. Although there are a few hundred known open clusters within that age range, a variety of reasons limit the chances of finding a planetary nebula within. For one reason, the planetary nebula phase for more massive stars is on the order of millennia, which is a blink of the eye in astronomical terms. Also, partly because of their small total mass, open clusters have relatively poor gravitational cohesion and tend to disperse after a relatively short time, typically from 100 to 600 million years.

== Current issues in planetary nebula studies ==
The distances to planetary nebulae are generally poorly determined, but the Gaia mission is now measuring direct parallactic distances between their central stars and neighboring stars. It is also possible to determine distances to nearby planetary nebula by measuring their expansion rates. High resolution observations taken several years apart will show the expansion of the nebula perpendicular to the line of sight, while spectroscopic observations of the Doppler shift will reveal the velocity of expansion in the line of sight. Comparing the angular expansion with the derived velocity of expansion will reveal the distance to the nebula.

The issue of how such a diverse range of nebular shapes can be produced is a debatable topic. It is theorised that interactions between material moving away from the star at different speeds give rise to most observed shapes. However, some astronomers postulate that close binary central stars might be responsible for the more complex and extreme planetary nebulae. Several have been shown to exhibit strong magnetic fields, and their interactions with ionized gas could explain some planetary nebulae shapes.

There are two main methods of determining metal abundances in nebulae. These rely on recombination lines and collisionally excited lines. Large discrepancies are sometimes seen between the results derived from the two methods. This may be explained by the presence of small temperature fluctuations within planetary nebulae. The discrepancies may be too large to be caused by temperature effects, and some hypothesize the existence of cold knots containing very little hydrogen to explain the observations. However, such knots have yet to be observed.

== See also ==
- Asymptotic giant branch
- Cosmic distance ladder
- Fast Low-Ionization Emission Region
- Nova remnant
- PG 1159 star (predegenerates)
- Protoplanetary nebula
- Supernova remnant
- White dwarf
- List of planetary nebulae
