= Hahn (crater) =

Crater on the Moon

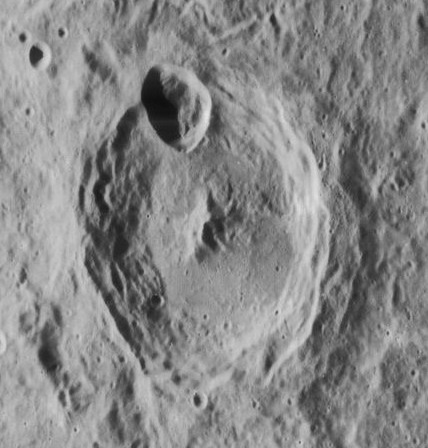
- Oblique Lunar Orbiter 4 image
- Coordinates: 31.3°N 73.6°E
- Diameter: 84 km
- Depth: 3.0 km
- Colongitude: 288° at sunrise
- Eponym: Friedrich von Hahn; Otto Hahn

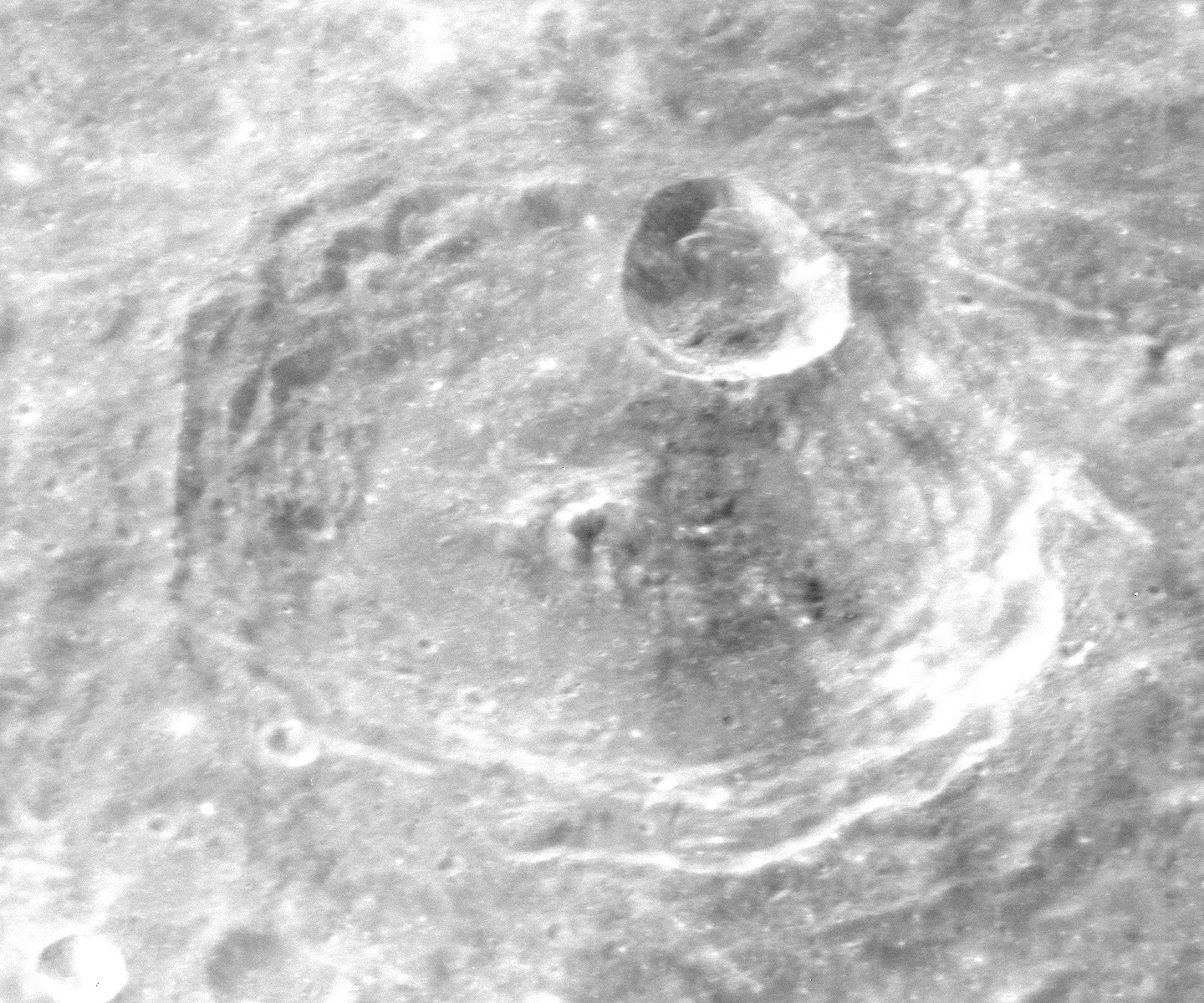
Oblique view from Apollo 16

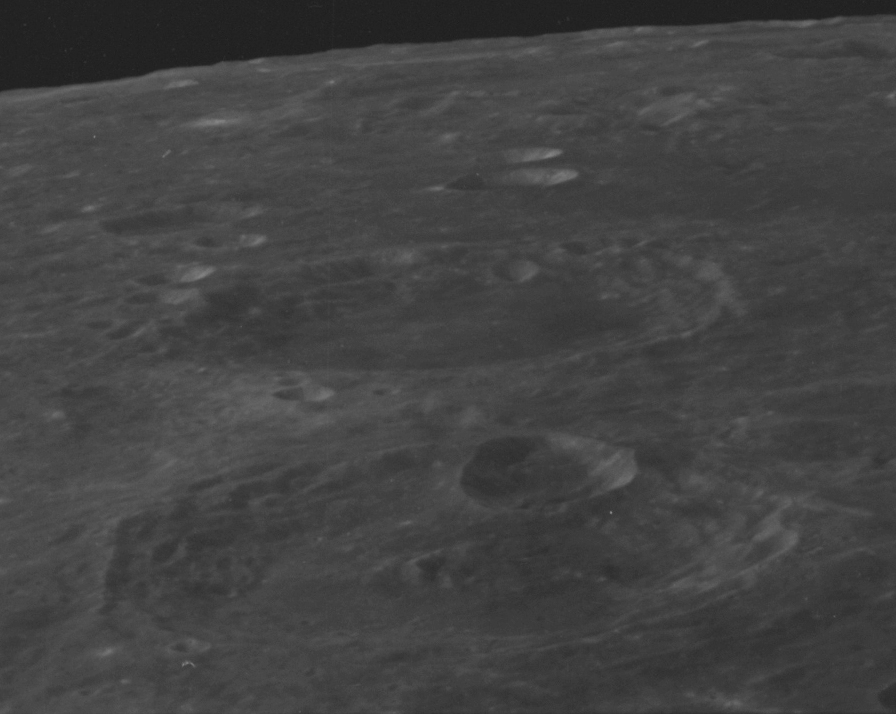
Oblique view of Hahn in foreground, and Berosus behind it, from Apollo 14

Hahn is a lunar impact crater that is located near the northeastern limb of the Moon. The crater appears oval when viewed from the Earth due to foreshortening. It is located less than one crater diameter to the southeast of Berosus, a slightly smaller formation.

This formation dates to the Early Imbrian epoch of the lunar geologic timescale. The inner wall of Hahn contains a system of terraces, particularly in the southern half. A smaller crater lies across the northwest rim, forming a break that reaches the interior floor. The interior floor has a region of lower albedo in the northern half, making it darker in appearance than the southern section of the floor. At the midpoint of the interior is an elongated central ridge, with the longer extent oriented north–south. The floor is also marked by several tiny craterlets.

The name Berosus was originally applied to this crater by Italian astronomer Giovanni Riccioli in 1651, but it was later changed to Hanh by German astronomer Johann Mädler.

== Satellite craters ==
By convention these features are identified on lunar maps by placing the letter on the side of the crater midpoint that is closest to Hahn.

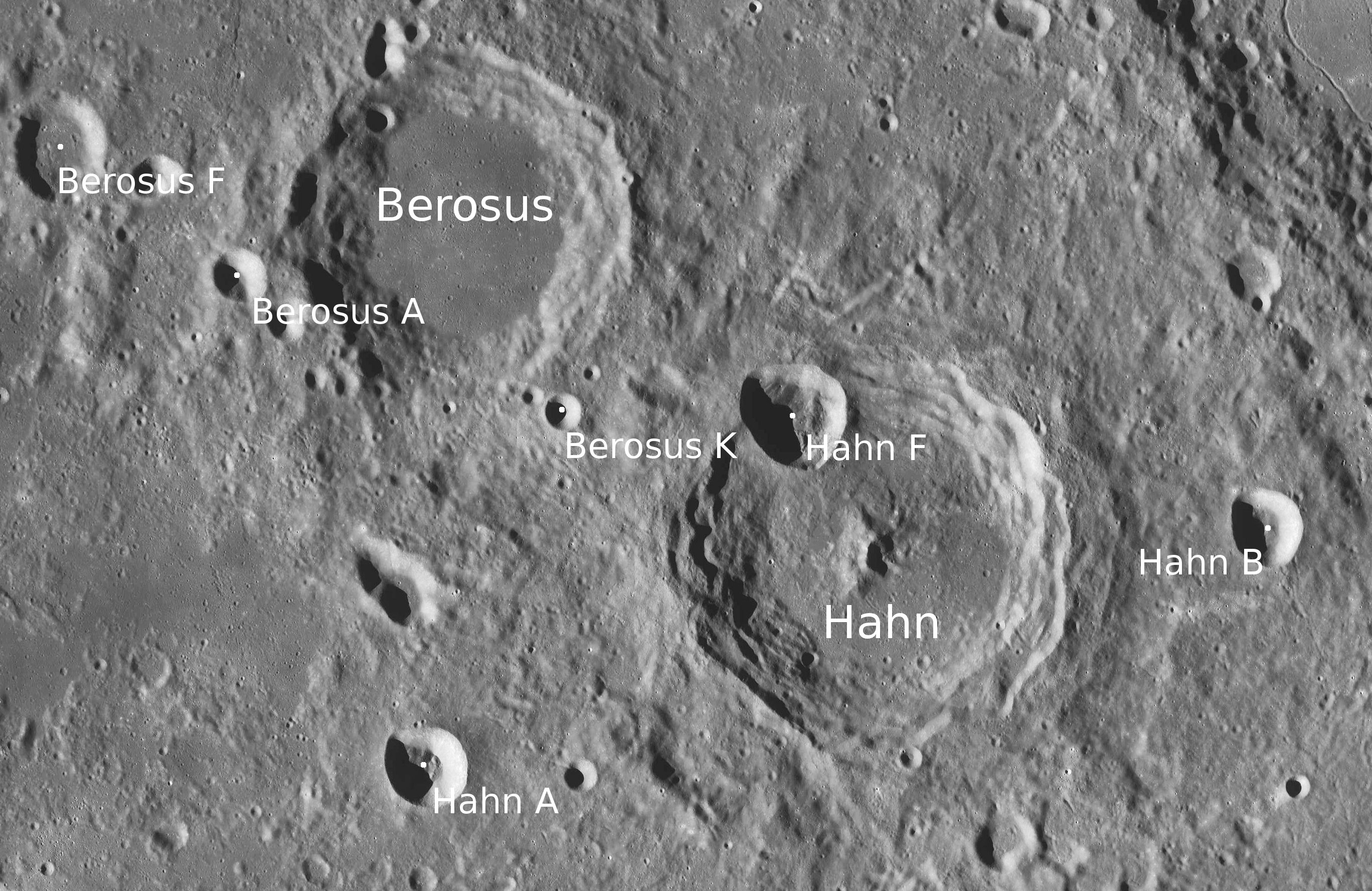

Hahn	Latitude	Longitude	Diameter
A	29.7° N	69.7° E	17 km
B	31.4° N	77.0° E	15 km
D	27.5° N	68.6° E	15 km
E	27.7° N	70.0° E	15 km
F	32.2° N	73.0° E	23 km
