= Antoine Darquier de Pellepoix =

French astronomer

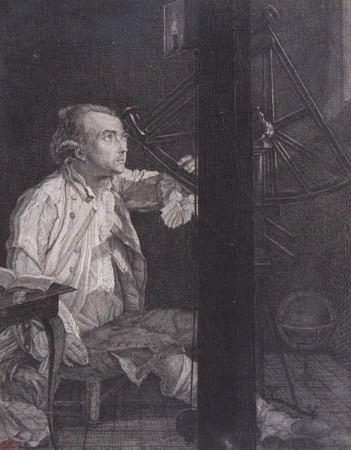
Léonard Defrance: Antoine Darquier de Pellepoix

Antoine Darquier de Pellepoix (23 November 1718, in Toulouse – 18 January 1802, in Toulouse) was a French astronomer. He has usually been credited with the discovery of the Ring Nebula in 1779, but in fact he independently rediscovered it upon reading a report of Charles Messier regarding Messier's own observations of Comet Bode. His description that the object was "...as large as Jupiter and resembles a planet which is fading" led to the terminology "planetary nebula".
