= Lyra in Chinese astronomy =

According to traditional Chinese uranography, the modern constellation Lyra is located within the northern quadrant of the sky, which is symbolized as the Black Tortoise of the North (北方玄武, Běi Fāng Xuán Wǔ).

The name of the western constellation in modern Chinese is 天琴座 (tiān qín zuò), meaning "the celestial zither constellation".

== Stars ==
The map of Chinese constellation in constellation Lyra area consists of :

Four Symbols	Mansion (Chinese name)	Romanization	Translation	Asterisms (Chinese name)	Romanization	Translation	Western star name	Proper Name	Chinese star name	Romanization	Translation
Black Tortoise of the North (北方玄武)	牛	Niú	Ox	織女	Zhīnǚ	Weaving Girl					
Black Tortoise of the North (北方玄武)	牛	Niú	Ox	織女	Zhīnǚ	Weaving Girl	α Lyr	Vega			
Black Tortoise of the North (北方玄武)	牛	Niú	Ox	織女	Zhīnǚ	Weaving Girl	α Lyr	Vega	織女一	Zhīnǚyī	1st star
Black Tortoise of the North (北方玄武)	牛	Niú	Ox	織女	Zhīnǚ	Weaving Girl	α Lyr	Vega	織女	Zhīnǚ	Weaving girl
Black Tortoise of the North (北方玄武)	牛	Niú	Ox	織女	Zhīnǚ	Weaving Girl	α Lyr	Vega	織女星	Zhīnǚxīng	Star of weaving girl
Black Tortoise of the North (北方玄武)	牛	Niú	Ox	織女	Zhīnǚ	Weaving Girl	α Lyr	Vega	織女大星	Zhīnǚdàxīng	Big star
Black Tortoise of the North (北方玄武)	牛	Niú	Ox	織女	Zhīnǚ	Weaving Girl	α Lyr	Vega	媭女	Xūnǚ	The sister
Black Tortoise of the North (北方玄武)	牛	Niú	Ox	織女	Zhīnǚ	Weaving Girl	α Lyr	Vega	婺女	Wùnǚ	
Black Tortoise of the North (北方玄武)	牛	Niú	Ox	織女	Zhīnǚ	Weaving Girl	α Lyr	Vega	天孫	Tiānsūn	Descendant of a god
Black Tortoise of the North (北方玄武)	牛	Niú	Ox	織女	Zhīnǚ	Weaving Girl	ε^{1} Lyr	Pongaponga (for component A)	織女二	Zhīnǚèr	2nd star
Black Tortoise of the North (北方玄武)	牛	Niú	Ox	織女	Zhīnǚ	Weaving Girl	ζ^{1} Lyr	Kautoki	織女三	Zhīnǚsān	3rd star
Black Tortoise of the North (北方玄武)	牛	Niú	Ox	織女	Zhīnǚ	Weaving Girl	ζ^{2} Lyr	Urquchillay	織女增一	Zhīnǚzēngsyī	1st additional star
Black Tortoise of the North (北方玄武)	牛	Niú	Ox	織女	Zhīnǚ	Weaving Girl	μ Lyr		織女增三	Zhīnǚzēngsān	3rd additional star
Black Tortoise of the North (北方玄武)	牛	Niú	Ox	織女	Zhīnǚ	Weaving Girl	κ Lyr		織女增四	Zhīnǚzēngsì	4th additional star
Black Tortoise of the North (北方玄武)	牛	Niú	Ox	漸台	Jiāntāi	Clepsydra Terrace					
Black Tortoise of the North (北方玄武)	牛	Niú	Ox	漸台	Jiāntāi	Clepsydra Terrace	δ^{2} Lyr	Jiantai	漸台一	Jiāntāiyī	1st star
Black Tortoise of the North (北方玄武)	牛	Niú	Ox	漸台	Jiāntāi	Clepsydra Terrace	β Lyr	Sheliak	漸台二	Jiāntāièr	2nd star
Black Tortoise of the North (北方玄武)	牛	Niú	Ox	漸台	Jiāntāi	Clepsydra Terrace	γ Lyr	Sulafat			
Black Tortoise of the North (北方玄武)	牛	Niú	Ox	漸台	Jiāntāi	Clepsydra Terrace	γ Lyr	Sulafat	漸台三	Jiāntāisān	3rd star
Black Tortoise of the North (北方玄武)	牛	Niú	Ox	漸台	Jiāntāi	Clepsydra Terrace	γ Lyr	Sulafat	下台西北星	Xiàtāisìběixīng	Star in the northwest of the Lower Steps (ν UMa and ξ UMa)
Black Tortoise of the North (北方玄武)	牛	Niú	Ox	漸台	Jiāntāi	Clepsydra Terrace	ι Lyr		漸台四	Jiāntāisì	4th star
Black Tortoise of the North (北方玄武)	牛	Niú	Ox	漸台	Jiāntāi	Clepsydra Terrace	δ^{1} Lyr		漸台增一	Jiāntāizēngyī	1st additional star
Black Tortoise of the North (北方玄武)	牛	Niú	Ox	漸台	Jiāntāi	Clepsydra Terrace	17 Lyr		漸台增三	Jiāntāizēngsān	3rd additional star
Black Tortoise of the North (北方玄武)	牛	Niú	Ox	漸台	Jiāntāi	Clepsydra Terrace	λ Lyr		漸台增四	Jiāntāizēngsì	4th additional star
Black Tortoise of the North (北方玄武)	牛	Niú	Ox	漸台	Jiāntāi	Clepsydra Terrace	ν^{2} Lyr		漸台增五	Jiāntāizēngwǔ	5th additional star
Black Tortoise of the North (北方玄武)	牛	Niú	Ox	漸台	Jiāntāi	Clepsydra Terrace	ν^{1} Lyr		漸台增六	Jiāntāizēngliù	6th additional star
Black Tortoise of the North (北方玄武)	牛	Niú	Ox	漸台	Jiāntāi	Clepsydra Terrace	HD 180138		漸台增七	Jiāntāizēngqī	7th additional star
Black Tortoise of the North (北方玄武)	牛	Niú	Ox	輦道	Niǎndào	Imperial Passageway					
Black Tortoise of the North (北方玄武)	牛	Niú	Ox	輦道	Niǎndào	Imperial Passageway	R Lyr	Niandao	輦道一	Niǎndàoyī	1st star
Black Tortoise of the North (北方玄武)	牛	Niú	Ox	輦道	Niǎndào	Imperial Passageway	η Lyr	Aladfar	輦道二	Niǎndàoèr	2nd star
Black Tortoise of the North (北方玄武)	牛	Niú	Ox	輦道	Niǎndào	Imperial Passageway	θ Lyr	Ninnisig	輦道三	Niǎndàosān	3rd star
Black Tortoise of the North (北方玄武)	牛	Niú	Ox	輦道	Niǎndào	Imperial Passageway	16 Lyr		辇道增一	Niǎndàozēngyī	1st additional star

== See also ==
- Chinese astronomy
- Traditional Chinese star names
- Chinese constellations
