= Nu Lyrae =

The Bayer designation ν Lyrae is shared by two stars in the constellation Lyra:

- ν^{1} Lyrae (8 Lyrae)
- ν^{2} Lyrae (9 Lyrae), sometimes simply called ν Lyrae
