= Zeta Lyrae =

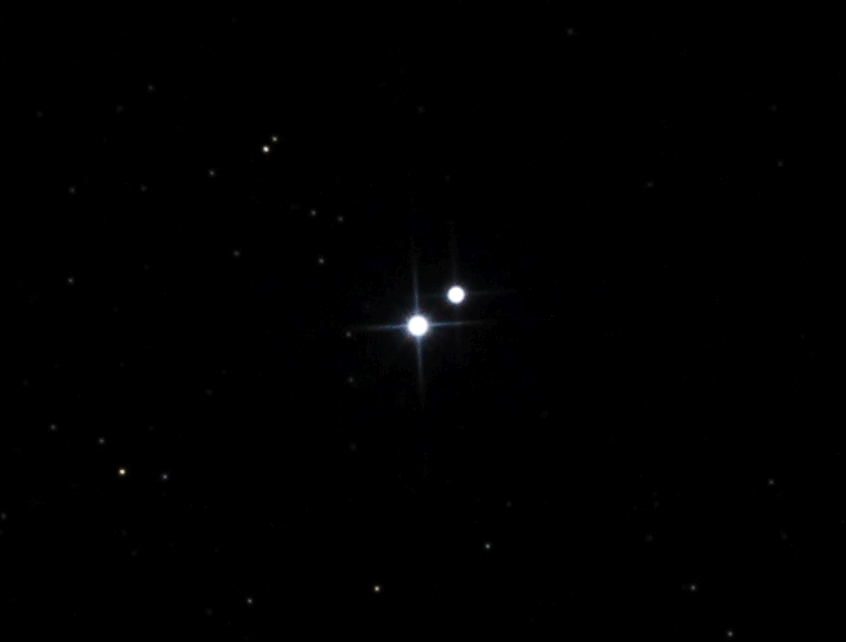
Zeta Lyrae, amateur image

The Bayer designation ζ Lyrae (Zeta Lyrae, ζ Lyr) is shared by two stars in the constellation Lyra:

- ζ^{1} Lyrae (6 Lyrae), a Binary Am star, with the primary component now named Kautoki
- ζ^{2} Lyrae (7 Lyrae), an F0 subgiant, also named Urquchillay

They form a double star with an angular separation of 44″, and are believed to be a physically associated binary system. ζ^{1} Lyrae is itself a spectroscopic binary, making the system triple.

Both stars were assigned names in 2026 after cultural asterisms in Lyra.
