= Messier 56 =

Globular cluster in the constellation Lyra

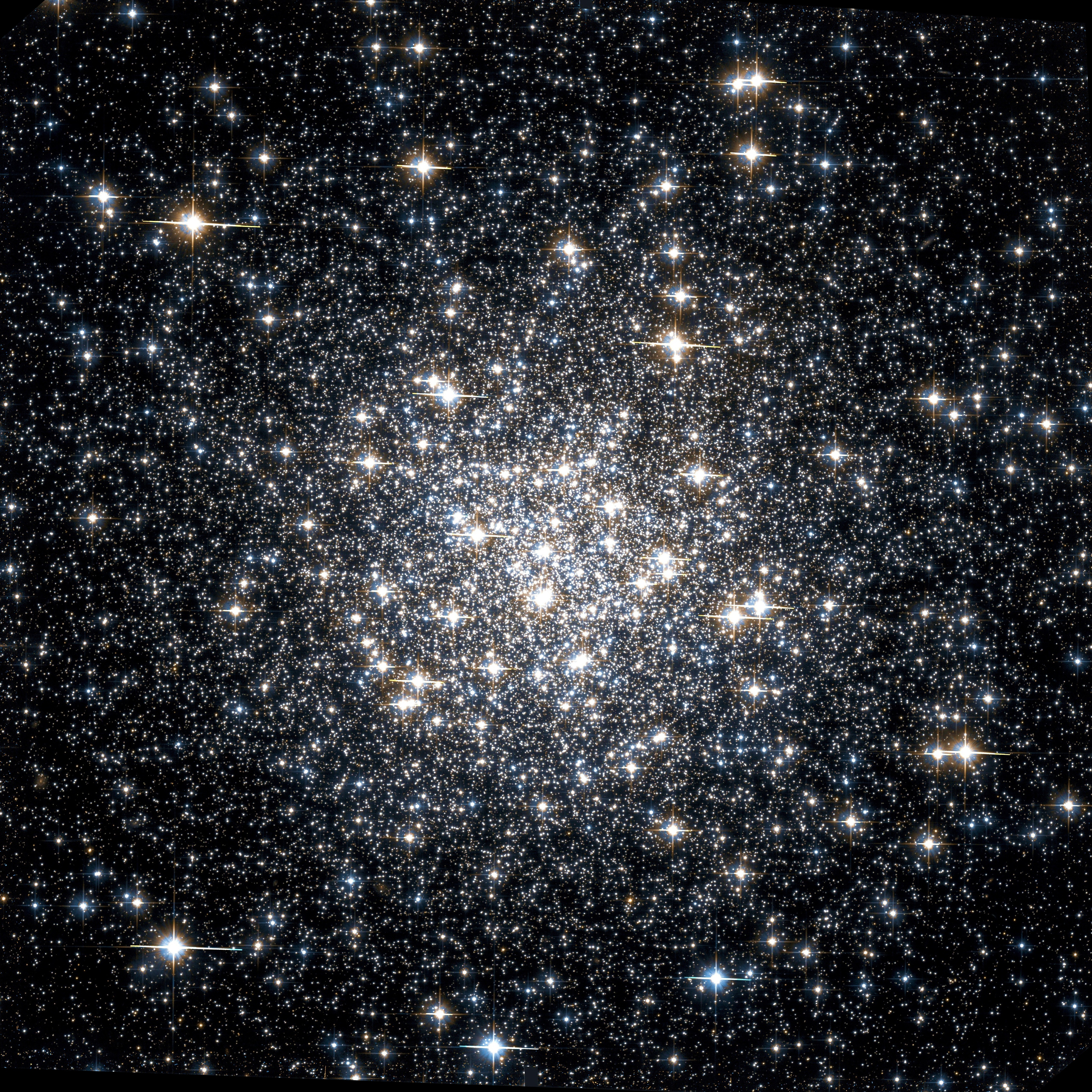
- Messier 56 by Hubble Space Telescope. 3.6′ view

Observation data (J2000 epoch)
- Class: X
- Constellation: Lyra
- Right ascension: 19^{h} 16^{m} 35.57^{s}
- Declination: +30° 11′ 00.5″
- Distance: 32.9 kly (10.1 kpc)
- Apparent magnitude (V): 8.3
- Apparent dimensions (V): 8.8'

Physical characteristics
- Mass: 2.30×10^{5} M_{☉}
- Radius: 42 ly
- Metallicity: [Fe/H] = –2.00 dex
- Estimated age: 13.70 Gyr
- Other designations: M56, NGC 6779, GCl 110, C 1914+300

Messier 56 (also known as M56 or NGC 6779) is a globular cluster in the constellation Lyra. (Note: Specifically in the center-northwest of Lyra which makes it visible from everywhere above about the 50th parallel south. However the Sun passes through Sagittarius far to the south (or technically the Earth orbits so as to make the Sun seem to do so) throughout December. This also makes the cluster mostly risen during day, not night, in the nearest months but will never impede pre-dawn and post-sunset views from the upper half of northerly latitudes.) It was discovered by Charles Messier in 1779. (Note: on January 19) It is angularly found about midway between Albireo (Beta (β) Cygni) and Sulafat (Gamma (γ) Lyrae). In a good night sky it is tricky to find with large (50–80 mm) binoculars, appearing as a slightly fuzzy star. The cluster can be resolved using a telescope with an aperture of 8 in (20 cm) or larger.

M56 is about 32,900 light-years away from Earth and measures roughly 84 light-years across, containing 230,000 solar masses (M_{☉}). It is about 31–32 kly (9.5–9.8 kpc) from the Galactic Center and 4.8 kly (1.5 kpc) above the galactic plane. This cluster has an estimated age of 13.70 billion years and is following a retrograde orbit through the Milky Way. The properties of this cluster suggest that it may have been acquired during the merger of a dwarf galaxy, of which Omega Centauri forms the surviving nucleus. For Messier 56, the abundance of elements other than hydrogen and helium, what astronomers term the metallicity, has a very low value of [Fe/H] = –2.00 dex which is 1/100 of the abundance in the Sun.

The brightest stars in M56 are of 13th magnitude, while it contains only about a dozen known variable stars, such as V6 (RV Tauri star; period: 90 days) or V1 (Cepheid: 1.510 days); other variable stars are V2 (irregular) and V3 (semiregular). In 2000, a diffuse X-ray emission was tentatively identified coming from the vicinity of the cluster. This is most likely interstellar medium that has been heated by the passage of the cluster through the galactic halo. The relative velocity of the cluster is about 177 km s^{−1}, which is sufficient to heat the medium in its wake to a temperature of 940,000 K.

M56 is part of the Gaia Sausage, the hypothesised remains of a merged dwarf galaxy.

== Gallery ==
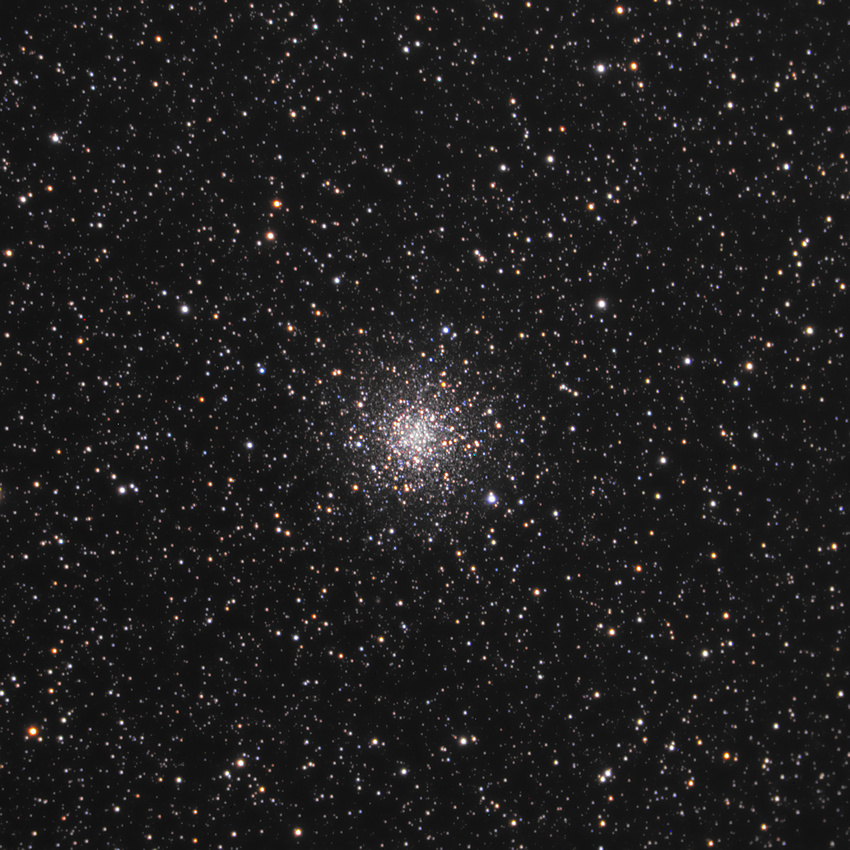
Messier 56 - wide field view

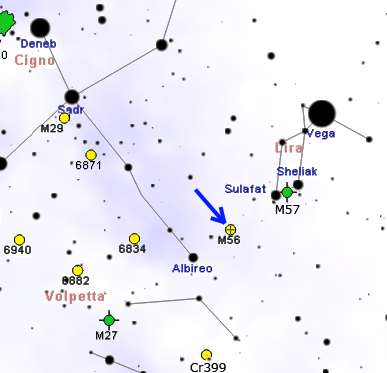
Map showing location of M56 (Roberto Mura)

== See also ==
- List of Messier objects
