= FL Lyrae =

Binary variable star

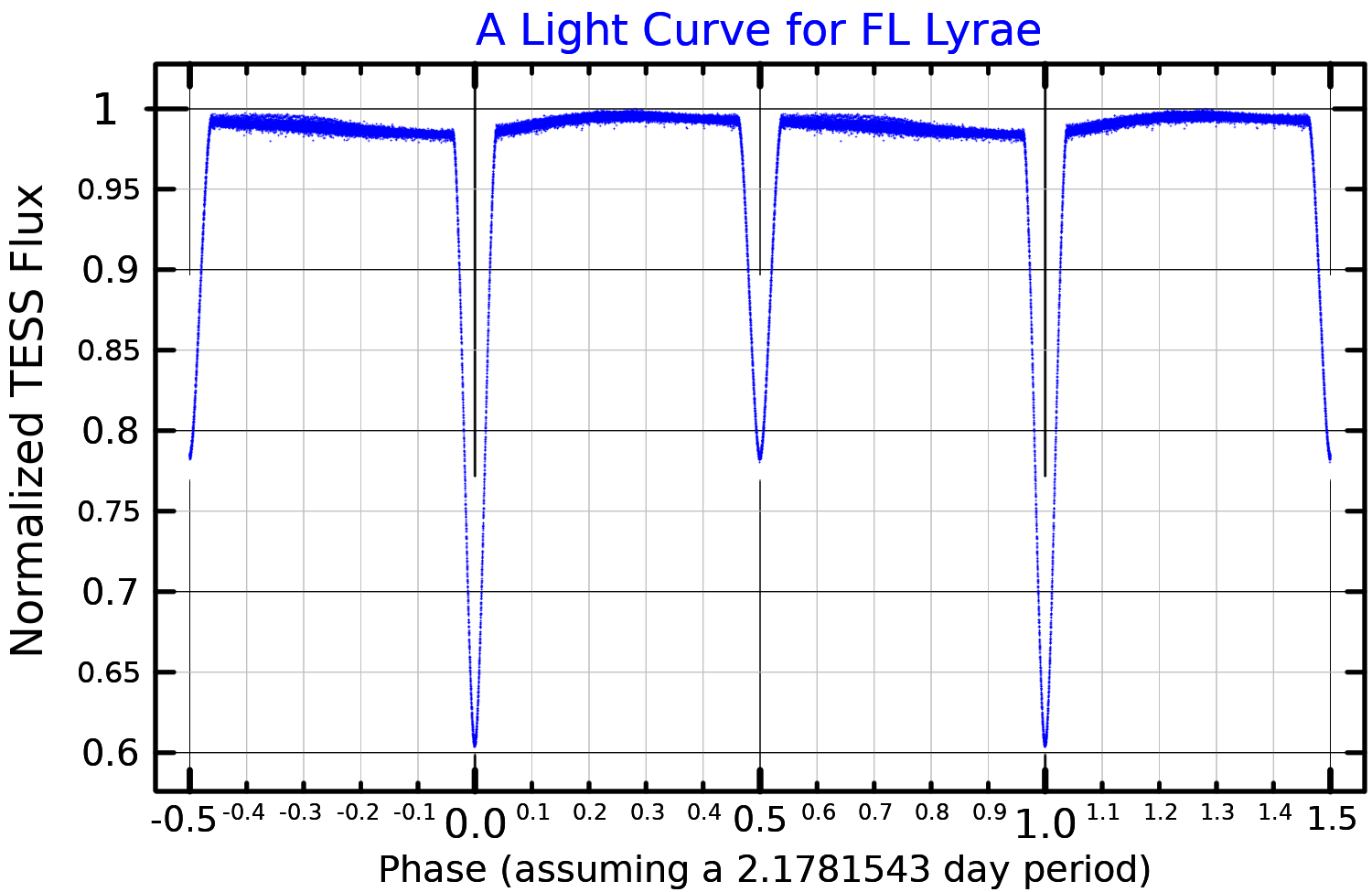
- A light curve for FL Lyrae, plotted from TESS data

Observation data Epoch J2000.0 Equinox ICRS
- Constellation: Lyra
- Right ascension: 19^{h} 12^{m} 04.862^{s}
- Declination: +46° 19′ 26.87″
- Apparent magnitude (V): 9.36

Characteristics
- Spectral type: G0V (F8 + G8)
- B−V color index: +0.55
- Variable type: Algol

Astrometry
Radial velocity (R_{v})	−39.20 km/s
Proper motion (μ)	RA: −0.172 mas/yr Dec.: +46.008 mas/yr
Parallax (π)	7.4577±0.0122 mas
Distance	437.3 ± 0.7 ly (134.1 ± 0.2 pc)
Absolute magnitude (M_{V})	3.84±0.08; 5.30±0.16

Details

FL Lyr A
Mass	1.218±0.016 M_{☉}
Radius	1.283±0.030 R_{☉}
Luminosity	2.17 L_{☉}
Surface gravity (log g)	4.31±0.02 cgs
Temperature	6,363±353 K
Metallicity [Fe/H]	−0.34 dex
Rotational velocity (v sin i)	29.2 km/s
Age	2.29 Gyr

FL Lyr B
Mass	0.958±0.011 M_{☉}
Radius	0.963±0.030 R_{☉}
Luminosity	0.65 L_{☉}
Surface gravity (log g)	4.45±0.03 cgs
Temperature	5,239±541 K

Other designations
- FL Lyr, BD+46°2641, HD 179890, HIP 94335, SAO 48190, KIC 9641031

Database references
SIMBAD	data

FL Lyrae is the variable star designation for an eclipsing binary star system in the northern constellation of Lyra. The combined apparent magnitude of the pair is 9.36, which means they are too faint to be seen with the naked eye. Parallax measurements put the system at a distance of around 437 light years from the Sun. This star system was in the view field of the Kepler space telescope during 2009−2014, which allowed monitoring during that spacecraft's mission.

The variability of this system was discovered from photographic plates in 1935. It is a binary star system with an orbital plane that is nearly aligned with the line of sight to the Earth. Once every 2.1781542 day orbit, each of the closely orbiting stars eclipses its partner, causing a net magnitude drop to 9.4 during the primary eclipse and to magnitude 9.1 when the secondary component is eclipsed. The secondary member covers 51% of the larger star during the primary eclipse, while the primary covers 88% of the secondary.

The measureable properties of an eclipsing binary can allow the physical parameters of the individual components to be worked out in some detail. The primary component has 122% of the Sun's mass, spans 128% of the radius of the Sun, and is emitting 217% of the Sun's luminosity. It is most likely an F-type main sequence star with a stellar classification of F8. The secondary is smaller, with 96% of the mass of the Sun, 96% of the Sun's radius, and radiates just 65% of the Sun's luminosity. This is a G-type main sequence star of class G8.

Based upon light variations measured during eclipses by the Kepler spacecraft, the system may contain a third body with twice the mass of Jupiter and an orbital period of under seven years. As of 2015, this remains to be confirmed.
