= Theta Lyrae =

Star in a trinary star system in the constellation Lyra

- Location of θ Lyrae (circled in red)

Observation data Epoch J2000.0 Equinox ICRS
- Constellation: Lyra
- Right ascension: 19^{h} 16^{m} 22.0951^{s}
- Declination: +38° 08′ 01.431″
- Apparent magnitude (V): 4.38

Characteristics
- Spectral type: K0II
- U−B color index: +1.23
- B−V color index: +1.26

Astrometry
| Radial velocity (R_{v}) | −31.05±0.14 km/s |
| Proper motion (μ) | RA: −2.864 mas/yr Dec.: 4.114 mas/yr |
| Parallax (π) | 4.2005±0.1053 mas |
| Distance | 755.9+21.9 −20.2 ly (237.9+6.7 −6.2 pc) |
| Absolute magnitude (M_{V}) | −2.76+0.27 −0.24 |

Details
| Radius | 60.31+1.92 −2.99 R_{☉} |
| Luminosity | 1,374±43 L_{☉} |
| Surface gravity (log g) | 1.93 cgs |
| Temperature | 4,523±44 K |
| Metallicity [Fe/H] | −0.01 dex |
| Rotational velocity (v sin i) | 3.6±1.4 km/s |

Other designations
- Ninnisig, θ Lyr, 21 Lyr, BD+37°3398, GC 26585, HD 180809, HIP 94713, HR 7314, SAO 68065, GSC 03121-02287, IDS 19129+3757 A

Database references
| SIMBAD | data |

Theta Lyrae (θ Lyr), also named Ninnisig, is a red giant star in the constellation Lyra, approximately 760 light-years away from Earth.

Theta Lyrae is an orange bright giant star of the spectral type K0II, which means that it possesses a surface temperature of about 5,000 K, and is many times bigger and brighter, yet cooler, than the Sun.

Ninnisig and Erragal are two ancient Sumerian deities associated with a pair of stars, identified as Theta Lyrae and Eta Lyrae (Aladfar). The IAU Working Group on Star Names adopted the name Ninnisig for this star on 18 June 2026.

BD+37°3399 and BD+37°3399B are respectively 10th- and 11th-magnitude companions, although not at the same distance. BD+37°3399 is a giant star with a spectral type of K2III. It is therefore almost the same temperature as Theta Lyrae. BD+37° 3399B is an 11th magnitude star of an unknown spectral type.
