= Mu Lyrae =

Star in the constellation of Lyra

- Location of μ Lyrae (circled in red)

Observation data Epoch J2000 Equinox ICRS
- Constellation: Lyra
- Right ascension: 18^{h} 24^{m} 13.78599^{s}
- Declination: +39° 30′ 26.0473″
- Apparent magnitude (V): 5.11

Characteristics
- Evolutionary stage: subgiant
- Spectral type: A3IVn
- U−B color index: +0.07
- B−V color index: +0.047±0.004

Astrometry
Radial velocity (R_{v})	−24.0±4.2 km/s
Proper motion (μ)	RA: −21.825±0.260 mas/yr Dec.: −4.460±0.288 mas/yr
Parallax (π)	7.9161±0.1438 mas
Distance	412 ± 7 ly (126 ± 2 pc)
Absolute magnitude (M_{V})	–0.53

Details
Mass	3.04±0.04 M_{☉}
Radius	5.80 (Note: Calculated, using the Stefan-Boltzmann law and the star's effective temperature and luminosity, with respect to the solar nominal effective temperature of 5,772 K: $$\sqrt{\biggl(\frac{5,772}{9,016}\biggr)^4 \cdot 200} = 5.80\ R_\odot.$$) (oblate) R_{☉}
Luminosity	200+23 −10 L_{☉}
Temperature	9,016+167 −165 K
Rotational velocity (v sin i)	165 km/s

Other designations
- μ Lyr, 2 Lyrae, BD+39°3410, HD 169702, HIP 90191, HR 6903, SAO 66943

Database references
SIMBAD	data

μ Lyrae, Latinized as Mu Lyrae, is a solitary star in the northern constellation Lyra. It has the traditional name Alathfar /əˈlæθfɑːr/, from the Arabic الأظفار al-ʼaẓfār "the talons (of the swooping eagle)", a name it shares with Eta Lyrae (though the latter is spelled "Aladfar" by the IAU). This white-hued object is visible to the naked eye as faint point of light with an apparent visual magnitude of 5.11. It is located approximately 412 light years distant from the Sun based on parallax, but is drifting closer with a radial velocity of −24 km/s.

This object has evolved off the main sequence, becoming a subgiant with a stellar classification of A0 IV. It has a fairly high rate of spin, showing a projected rotational velocity of 165 km/s. This is giving the star an equatorial bulge that is an estimated 17% larger than the polar radius. The star has three times the mass of the Sun and about 5.8 times the Sun's radius. It is radiating 200 times the Sun's luminosity from its photosphere at an effective temperature of 9,016 K.
