= HD 173780 =

Star in the constellation Lyra

- Location of HD 173780 (circled in red)

Observation data Epoch J2000.0 Equinox ICRS
- Constellation: Lyra
- Right ascension: 18^{h} 46^{m} 04.47950^{s}
- Declination: +26° 39′ 43.6644″
- Apparent magnitude (V): +4.84

Characteristics
- Evolutionary stage: Horizontal branch
- Spectral type: K3III
- B−V color index: 1.20

Astrometry
Radial velocity (R_{v})	−16.92±0.17 km/s
Proper motion (μ)	RA: +17.460 mas/yr Dec.: +23.819 mas/yr
Parallax (π)	13.7599±0.1315 mas
Distance	237 ± 2 ly (72.7 ± 0.7 pc)
Absolute magnitude (M_{V})	0.37

Details
Mass	1.70 M_{☉}
Radius	16.38+0.22 −0.47 R_{☉}
Luminosity	91.5±1.0 L_{☉}
Surface gravity (log g)	2.42±0.08 cgs
Temperature	4,468±19 K
Metallicity [Fe/H]	−0.04±0.05 dex
Rotational velocity (v sin i)	3.8 km/s
Age	2.42 Gyr

Other designations
- BD+26°3349, HD 173780, HIP 92088, HR 7064, SAO 86418

Database references
SIMBAD	data

HD 173780 is a single star in the northern constellation Lyra, near the southern constellation border with Hercules. It is an orange-hued star that is faintly visible to the naked eye with an apparent visual magnitude of +4.84. This object is located at a distance of approximately 237 light years from the Sun based on parallax, but is drifting closer with a radial velocity of −17 km/s.

This is an aging giant star with a stellar classification of K3III. It is a red clump giant, indicating it is on the horizontal branch and is generating energy through the fusion of helium at its core. The star is 2.4 billion years old with 1.7 times the mass of the Sun. With the supply of hydrogen exhausted at its core, it has expanded to 16 times the radius of the Sun. The star is radiating 92 times the luminosity of the Sun from its enlarged photosphere at an effective temperature of 4,468 K.
