= 19 Lyrae =

Star in the constellation Lyra

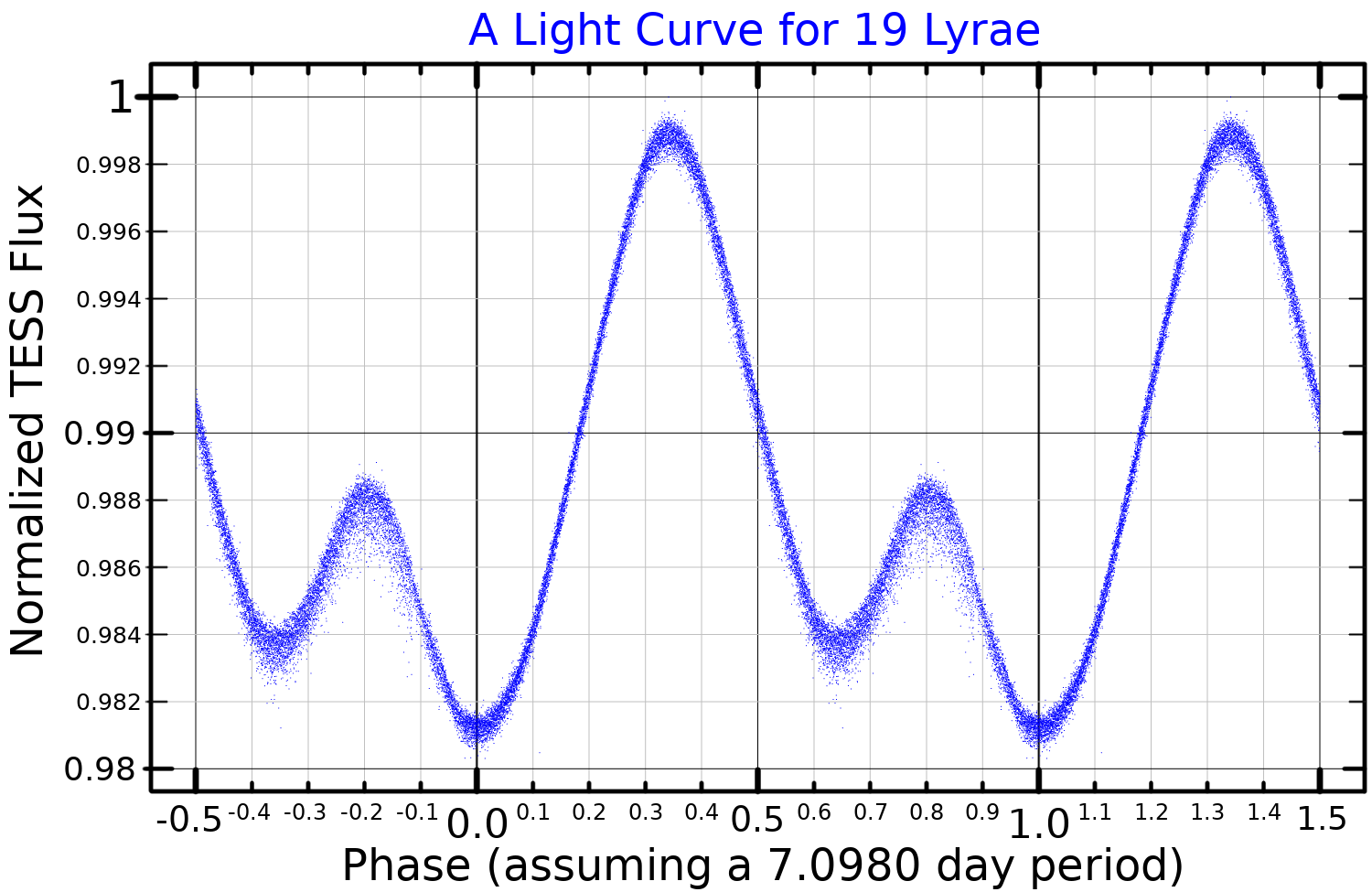
- A light curve for 19 Lyrae, plotted from TESS data

Observation data Epoch J2000.0 Equinox ICRS
- Constellation: Lyra
- Right ascension: 19^{h} 11^{m} 46.008^{s}
- Declination: +31° 17′ 00.44″
- Apparent magnitude (V): 5.93

Characteristics
- Spectral type: B8 IIIp Si Sr
- B−V color index: −0.062±0.004
- Variable type: α^{2} CVn

Astrometry
Radial velocity (R_{v})	−30.1±2.9 km/s
Proper motion (μ)	RA: −4.143 mas/yr Dec.: −2.763 mas/yr
Parallax (π)	3.4213±0.0417 mas
Distance	950 ± 10 ly (292 ± 4 pc)
Absolute magnitude (M_{V})	−1.24

Details
Mass	3.76±0.22 M_{☉}
Radius	6.40 R_{☉}
Luminosity	397.48 L_{☉}
Temperature	11,194+501 −479 K
Rotational velocity (v sin i)	35 km/s

Other designations
- 19 Lyr, V471 Lyr, NSV 11806, BD+31°3497, FK5 3532, GC 26459, HD 179527, HIP 94311, HR 7283, SAO 67946

Database references
SIMBAD	data

19 Lyrae is a single variable star located approximately 950 light years away from the Sun in the northern constellation of Lyra. It has the variable star designation V471 Lyr, while 19 Lyrae is the Flamsteed designation. This object is just bright enough to be visible to the naked eye, appearing as a dim, blue-white star with a baseline apparent visual magnitude of 5.93. It is moving closer to the Earth with a heliocentric radial velocity of −30 km/s, and may come as close as 167 light-years around 8.5 million years from now.

This is a magnetic chemically-peculiar star with a stellar classification of B8 IIIp Si Sr, showing abundance anomalies in silicon and strontium. The light variations of this star were discovered by J. E. Winzer in 1974. It is an Alpha^{2} Canum Venaticorum-type variable with a period of 1.160898 days (or 7.0980 days), ranging in magnitude from a high of 5.91 down to 5.98. The surface magnetic field has a strength of (111.3±56.9)×10^{−4} T

19 Lyrae has a moderate rotation rate, showing a projected rotational velocity of 35 km/s. Stellar models give it an estimated 3.8 times the mass of the Sun and its girth is measured at 6.4 times the Sun's radius. It is radiating 397 times the luminosity of the Sun from its photosphere at an effective temperature of around 11,194 K. The star has an absolute magnitude of −1.24, which shows how bright the star would appear if it were located at a distance of 10 parsecs (33 ly) from the Sun.
