= LSR J1835+3259 =

Ultracool dwarf

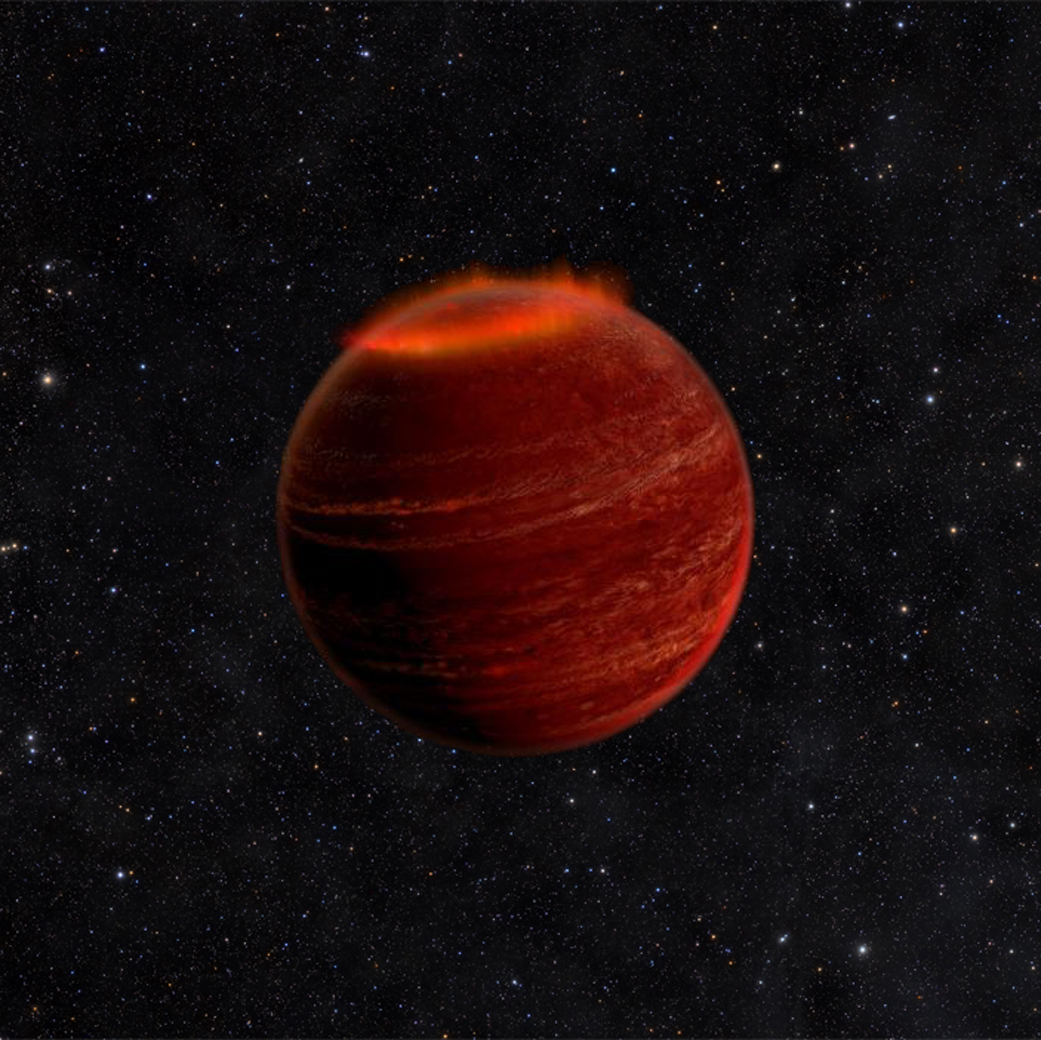
- Artist's impression of LSR J1835+3259 and its aurorae. Credit: Chuck Carter and Gregg Hallinan/Caltech

Observation data Epoch J2000 Equinox J2000
- Constellation: Lyra
- Right ascension: 18^{h} 35^{m} 37.902^{s}
- Declination: +32° 59′ 54.59″

Characteristics
- Spectral type: M8.5
- Apparent magnitude (V (USNO filter system)): 18.27 ± 0.03
- Apparent magnitude (I (USNO filter system)): 13.46 ± 0.02
- Apparent magnitude (z (USNO filter system)): 12.63 ± 0.02
- Apparent magnitude (J (2MASS filter system)): 10.27 ± 0.03
- Apparent magnitude (H (2MASS filter system)): 9.58 ± 0.05
- Apparent magnitude (K_{s} (2MASS filter system)): 9.15 ± 0.04

Astrometry
Radial velocity (R_{v})	-10 ± 40 km/s
Proper motion (μ)	RA: −72.650±0.047 mas/yr Dec.: −755.146±0.052 mas/yr
Parallax (π)	175.7930±0.0468 mas
Distance	18.553 ± 0.005 ly (5.689 ± 0.002 pc)

Details
Mass	55 ± 4 M_{Jup}
Radius	2.1 ± 0.1 R_{Jup}
Surface gravity (log g)	4.5 ± 0.05 cgs
Temperature	2800 ± 30 K
Age	22 ± 4 Myr

Other designations
- 2MASSI J1835379+325954, 2MASS 1835+32, 2MASS J18353790+3259545, LSR 1835+3259, 2MUCD 11792, [B2006] J183537.9+325955, LSPM J1835+3259, USNO-B1.0 1229-00376318

Database references
SIMBAD	data
- Location of LSR J1835+3259 in the constellation Lyra

LSR J1835+3259 is a nearby ultracool dwarf of spectral class M8.5, located in constellation Lyra, the discovery of which was published in 2003. Previously it was concluded that this star is a young brown dwarf, but no lithium absorption lines are detected for this object, which is a strong indicator for young brown dwarfs that need 10–100 million years to deplete lithium.

== Distance ==
Trigonometric parallax of this object, measured in 2001–2002 with the USNO 61 inch (1.5 m) reflector under US Naval Observatory (USNO) parallax program, is 0.1765 ± 0.0005 arcsec, corresponding to a distance of 5.67 ± 0.02 pc, or 18.48 ± 0.05 ly.

== Characteristics ==
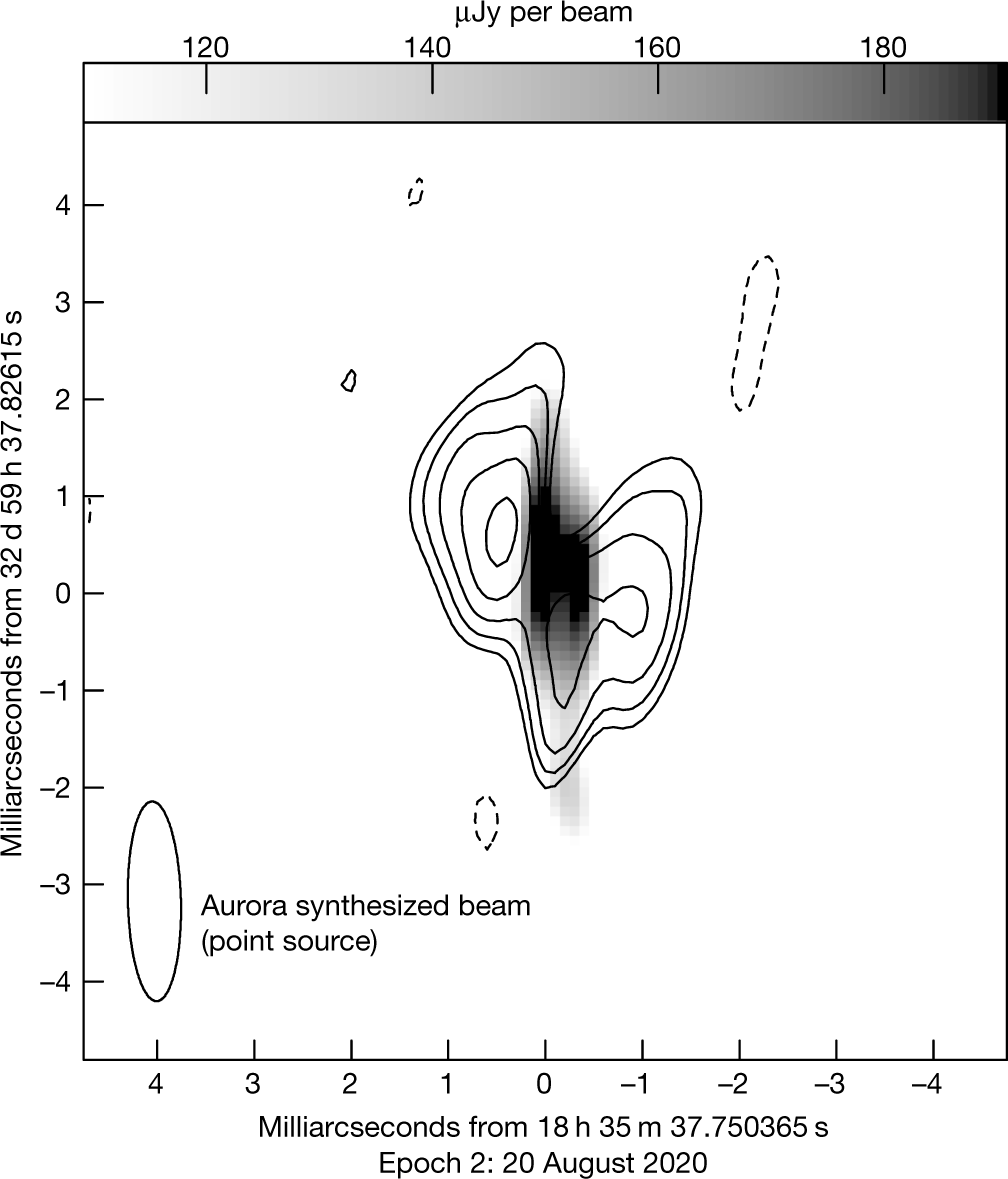
Image of LSR 1835+3259 with the High Sensitive Array. Quiescent emission in contours, showing the radio lobes. The right-circularly polarized aurora is the pixelated dark spot in the center.

The first potential extrasolar auroras detected occurred in the atmosphere of LSR J1835+3259. They were found in July 2015 by the Karl G. Jansky Very Large Array in New Mexico by analyzing the emitted radio waves. The auroras detected were probably 1 million times brighter than those ever observed on Earth. The optical emission is mainly red in colour, because the charged particles are interacting with hydrogen in its atmosphere. It is not known what the cause is, though some have speculated that material may be being stripped off the surface of the brown dwarf via stellar winds to produce its own electrons. Another possible explanation is an as-yet-undetected planet or moon around the dwarf, which is throwing off material to light it up, as is the case with Jupiter and its moon Io. High resolution imaging using the High Sensitivity Array resolved the quiescent radio emission into two radio lobes, showing that it has a similar structure as Jupiter radiation belts. The radiation belt is seen in three epochs, spanning more than one year. The two lobes are separated by up to 18 of the object's own radii and the right-circularly polarized aurora appears right in the middle of the two lobes.
