= Zeta1 Lyrae =

Star in the constellation Lyra

ζ^{1} Lyrae
- Location of ζ Lyrae (circled)

Observation data Epoch J2000.0 Equinox J2000.0 (ICRS)
- Constellation: Lyra
- Right ascension: 18^{h} 44^{m} 46.35708^{s}
- Declination: +37° 36′ 18.4380″
- Apparent magnitude (V): 4.37

Characteristics
- Spectral type: kA5hF0mF2
- U−B color index: +0.17
- B−V color index: +0.18

Astrometry
Radial velocity (R_{v})	+9.8±11.5 km/s
Proper motion (μ)	RA: +25.347 mas/yr Dec.: +19.824 mas/yr
Parallax (π)	20.6632±0.1296 mas
Distance	157.8 ± 1.0 ly (48.4 ± 0.3 pc)
Absolute magnitude (M_{V})	+0.94

Orbit
Period (P)	4.3 d
Eccentricity (e)	0.01
Periastron epoch (T)	2440000.723 JD
Argument of periastron (ω) (secondary)	0.00°
Semi-amplitude (K_{1}) (primary)	51.6 km/s

Details
Mass	2.36 M_{☉}
Radius	2.5 R_{☉}
Luminosity	31 L_{☉}
Surface gravity (log g)	3.7±0.1 cgs
Temperature	7914±112 K
Metallicity [Fe/H]	0.38±0.06 dex
Rotational velocity (v sin i)	47 km/s
Age	500 Myr

Other designations
- Kautoki, ζ^{1} Lyr, 6 Lyr, BD+37°3222, HD 173648, HIP 91971, HR 7056, SAO 67321

Database references
SIMBAD	data

Zeta^{1} Lyrae, also named Kautoki, is a binary star in the northern constellation of Lyra. Based upon an annual parallax shift of 20.66 mas as seen from Earth, the pair are located about 158 light-years from the Sun. It is visible to the naked eye with an apparent visual magnitude of 4.37.

== Nomenclature ==
Zeta^{1} Lyrae, Latinized from ζ^{1} Lyrae, is the star's Bayer designation. On the island of Kapingamarangi, an asterism of Vega, δ Lyrae, ε Lyrae, and ζ Lyrae is known as Kautoki, the adze handle. The IAU Working Group on Star Names adopted the name Kautoki for ζ^{1} Lyrae A on 18 June 2026.

== Observational history ==
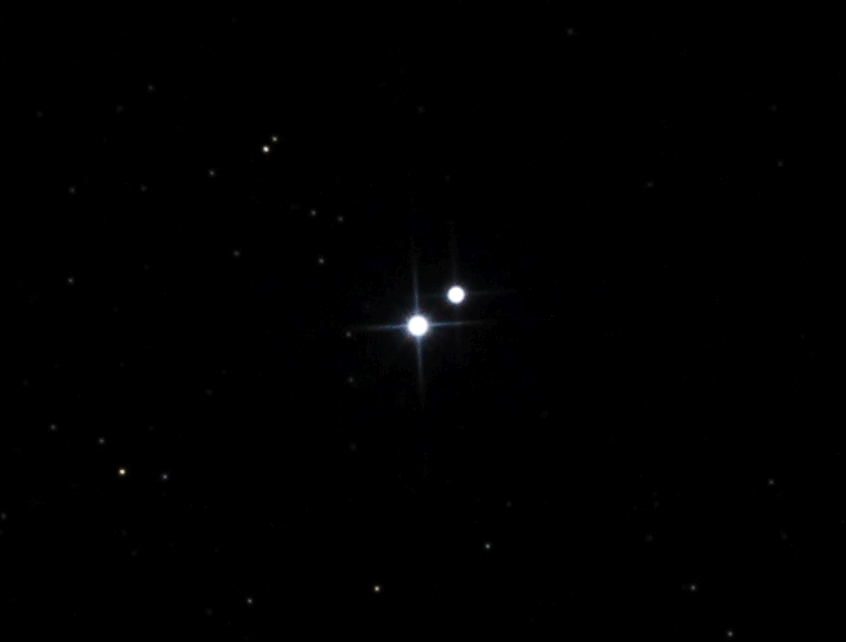
The stars Zeta1 and Zeta2 Lyrae photographed with an amateur telescope by David Chifiriuc. The visual separation between the two stars is 43.7″ (in 2020).

ζ^{1} Lyrae was discovered to be a spectroscopic binary by William Wallace Campbell and Heber Doust Curtis in 1905 from photographic plates taken at the Lick Observatory between 1902 and 1904. The first orbit was calculated by Frank Craig Jordan of Allegheny Observatory in 1910 with results in good agreement with the most recent orbit.

Several other faint stars within about an arc-minute have been listed as companions, but none are physically associated with ζ^{1} Lyrae.

== Binary system ==
This is a single-lined spectroscopic binary system with an orbital period of 4.3 days and a nearly circular orbit with an eccentricity of 0.01. The primary, component A, is an Am star with a stellar classification of kA5hF0mF2. This complex notation indicates that the spectral type determined solely from the calcium K line would be A5, the spectral type determined from other metallic lines would be F2, and the type determined from hydrogen lines would be F0.

== Variability ==
ζ^{1} Lyrae appears to be slightly variable, with a frequency of 0.65256 cycles per day and an amplitude of 0.0032 in magnitude. The star has an estimated 2.36 times the mass of the Sun and around 2.5 times the Sun's radius. The position of this system is associated with an X-ray source with a luminosity of 571.6×10^{20} W.
