= 17 Lyrae =

Star in the constellation Lyra

17 Lyrae AB
- Location of 17 Lyrae (circled)

Observation data Epoch J2000.0 Equinox ICRS
- Constellation: Lyra
- AB
- Right ascension: 19^{h} 07^{m} 25.58012^{s}
- Declination: +32° 30′ 6.2599″
- Apparent magnitude (V): 5.221
- A
- Right ascension: 19^{h} 07^{m} 25.58^{s}
- Declination: +32° 30′ 06.3″
- Apparent magnitude (V): 5.26
- B
- Right ascension: 19^{h} 07^{m} 25.31^{s}
- Declination: +32° 30′ 07.5″
- Apparent magnitude (V): 9.1

Characteristics
- Spectral type: F0V
- U−B color index: +0.044
- B−V color index: +0.351

Astrometry

A
| Proper motion (μ) | RA: +114.276 mas/yr Dec.: +18.316 mas/yr |
| Parallax (π) | 22.8557±0.0782 mas |
| Distance | 142.7 ± 0.5 ly (43.8 ± 0.1 pc) |

B
| Proper motion (μ) | RA: +120.597 mas/yr Dec.: +9.110 mas/yr |
| Parallax (π) | 22.8407±0.0190 mas |
| Distance | 142.8 ± 0.1 ly (43.78 ± 0.04 pc) |

Orbit
| Primary | A |
| Period (P) | 42.857 days |
| Eccentricity (e) | 0.0 |
| Semi-amplitude (K_{1}) (primary) | 13.10 km/s |

Details

A
| Mass | 1.6 M_{☉} |
| Radius | 2.5 R_{☉} |
| Luminosity | 16.4 L_{☉} |
| Surface gravity (log g) | 3.57 cgs |
| Temperature | 6,887 K |
| Metallicity [Fe/H] | 0.0 dex |
| Rotational velocity (v sin i) | 138 km/s |
| Age | 1.4 Gyr |

B
| Mass | 0.73 M_{☉} |
| Surface gravity (log g) | 4.61 cgs |
| Temperature | 5,266 K |
| Metallicity [Fe/H] | −0.46 dex |

Other designations
- 17 Lyrae, HR 7261, BD+32°3326, HD 178449, SAO 67835, HIP 93917, GC 26340, CCDM J19075+3231, IDS 19036+3221

Database references
| SIMBAD | data |

17 Lyrae is a multiple star system in the constellation Lyra, 143 light years away from Earth.

== Components ==
The 17 Lyrae system contains two visible components, designated A and B, separated by 2.48" in 1997. The primary star is a single-lined spectroscopic binary with a period of 42.9 days.

There was once thought to be a fourth star in the system, the red dwarf binary Kuiper 90, designated 17 Lyrae C, until it was evident that the star's parallax and proper motions were too different for it to be part of the system. The separation between 17 Lyrae AB and C is increasing rapidly, from less than 2' in 1881 to nearly 5' in 2014.

A number of other visual companions have been catalogued. The closest is the 11th magnitude star at 39", and the brightest is BD+32 3325 just over 2' away.

== Properties ==
The primary component, 17 Lyrae A, is a 5th magnitude main sequence star of the spectral type F0, meaning it has a surface temperature of about 6,750 K. It is about 60% more massive than the sun and 16 times more luminous. It has been catalogued as an Am star but is now believed to be a relatively normal quickly-rotating star.

The visible companion 17 Lyrae B is a 9th magnitude star of an unknown spectral type. The spectroscopic companion cannot be detected in the spectrum and its properties are uncertain. Faint sharp spectral lines contrasting with the broadened lines of the primary may originate in a shell of material around the stars.
