= Beta Lyrae =

Multiple star system in the constellation of Lyra

- Location of β Lyrae (circled in red)

Observation data Epoch J2000.0 Equinox ICRS
- Constellation: Lyra
- Right ascension: 18^{h} 50^{m} 04.79525^{s}
- Declination: +33° 21′ 45.6100″
- Apparent magnitude (V): 3.25 – 4.36

Characteristics
- Spectral type: B6-8II + B
- U−B color index: −0.56
- B−V color index: +0.00
- Variable type: β Lyr

Astrometry

A
| Radial velocity (R_{v}) | −19.2 km/s |
| Proper motion (μ) | RA: 1.90 mas/yr Dec.: −3.53 mas/yr |
| Parallax (π) | 3.39±0.17 mas |
| Distance | 960 ± 50 ly (290 ± 10 pc) |
| Absolute magnitude (M_{V}) | −3.82 |

B
| Radial velocity (R_{v}) | −14±5 km/s |
| Proper motion (μ) | RA: 4.373±0.087 mas/yr Dec.: −0.982±0.098 mas/yr |
| Parallax (π) | 3.0065±0.0542 mas |
| Distance | 1,080 ± 20 ly (333 ± 6 pc) |

Orbit
| Primary | Aa1 |
| Secondary | Beta Lyrae Aa2 |
| Period (P) | 12.9414 days |
| Semi-major axis (a) | 0.865±0.048 mas |
| Eccentricity (e) | 0 |
| Inclination (i) | 92.25 ± 0.82° |
| Longitude of the node (Ω) | 254.39 ± 0.83° |

Details

β Lyr Aa1
| Mass | 2.97 ± 0.2 M_{☉} |
| Radius | 15.2 ± 0.2 R_{☉} |
| Luminosity | 6,500 L_{☉} |
| Surface gravity (log g) | 2.5 ± 0.1 cgs |
| Temperature | 13,300 K |
| Age | 23 Myr |

β Lyr Aa2
| Mass | 13.16 ± 0.3 M_{☉} |
| Radius | 6.0 ± 0.2 R_{☉} |
| Luminosity | 26,300 L_{☉} |
| Surface gravity (log g) | 4.0 ± 0.1 cgs |
| Temperature | 30,000 ± 2,000 K |

Other designations
- Sheliak, Shelyak, Shiliak, WDS 18501+3322
- β Lyrae A: 10 Lyrae, AAVSO 1846+33, BD+33 3223, FK5 705, HD 174638, HIP 92420, HR 7106, SAO 67451/2
- β Lyrae B: HD 174664, BD+33 3224, SAO 67453

Database references
| SIMBAD | β Lyrae |
- B

Beta Lyrae (β Lyrae, abbreviated Beta Lyr, β Lyr), officially named Sheliak (Arabic: الشلياق, Romanization: ash-Shiliyāq) (IPA: /ˈʃiːliæk/), the traditional name of the system, is a multiple star system in the constellation of Lyra. Based on parallax measurements obtained during the Hipparcos mission, it is approximately 960 light-years (290 parsecs) distant from the Sun.

Although it appears as a single point of light to the naked eye, it actually consists of six components of apparent magnitude 14.3 or brighter. The brightest component, designated Beta Lyrae A, is itself a triple star system, consisting of an eclipsing binary pair (Aa) and a single star (Ab). The binary pair's two components are designated Beta Lyrae Aa1 and Aa2. The additional five components, designated Beta Lyrae B, C, D, E, and F, are currently considered to be single stars.

== Nomenclature ==
β Lyrae (Latinised to Beta Lyrae) is the system's Bayer designation, established by Johann Bayer in his Uranometria of 1603, and denotes that it is the second brightest star in the Lyra constellation. WDS J18501+3322 is a designation in the Washington Double Star Catalog. The designations of the constituents as Beta Lyrae A, B and C, or alternatively WDS J18501+3322A, B and C, and additionally WDS J18501+3322D, E and F, and those of A's components - Aa1, Aa2 and Ab - derive from the convention used by the Washington Multiplicity Catalog (WMC) for multiple star systems, and adopted by the International Astronomical Union (IAU).

Beta Lyrae bore the traditional name Sheliak (occasionally Shelyak or Shiliak), derived from the Arabic الشلياق šiliyāq or Al Shilyāk, one of the names of the constellation of Lyra in Islamic astronomy. Notably, in Arabic sources the Lyra constellation is primarily referred to as سِلْيَاق (Romanization: Siliyāq), whereas شلياق (Šiliyāq) primarily is used to refer to Beta Lyrae in what might be a form of linguistic reborrowing. Persian sources on the other hand, do refer to the Lyra constellation as شلياق (Šiliyāq), which may be the source of this confusion.

In 2016, the International Astronomical Union organized a Working Group on Star Names (WGSN) to catalogue and standardize proper names for stars. The WGSN decided to attribute proper names to individual stars rather than entire multiple systems. It approved the name Sheliak for the component Beta Lyrae Aa1 on 21 August 2016 and it is now so included in the List of IAU-approved Star Names.

In Chinese astronomy, Tsan Tae (漸台 (Jiāntāi), meaning Clepsydra Terrace, refers to an asterism consisting of this star, Delta² Lyrae, Gamma Lyrae and Iota Lyrae. Consequently, the Chinese name for Beta Lyrae itself is 漸台二 (Jiāntāièr, English: the Second Star of Clepsydra Terrace.)

== Properties ==
Beta Lyrae Aa is a semidetached binary system made up of a stellar class B6-8 primary star and a secondary that is probably also a B-type star. The fainter, less massive star in the system was once the more massive member of the pair, which caused it to evolve away from the main sequence first and become a giant star. Because the pair are in a close orbit, as this star expanded into a giant it filled its Roche lobe and transferred most of its mass over to its companion.

The secondary, now more massive star is surrounded by an accretion disk from this mass transfer, with bipolar, jet-like features projecting perpendicular to the disk. This accretion disk blocks humans' view of the secondary star, lowering its apparent luminosity and making it difficult for astronomers to pinpoint what its stellar type is. The amount of mass being transferred between the two stars is about 2 × 10^{−5} solar masses per year, or the equivalent of the Sun's mass every 50,000 years, which results in an increase in orbital period of about 19 seconds each year. The spectrum of Beta Lyrae shows emission lines produced by the accretion disc. The disc produces around 20% of the brightness of the system.

In 2006, an adaptive optics survey detected a possible third companion, Beta Lyrae Ab. It was detected at 0.54" angular separation with a differential magnitude of +4.53. The difference in magnitudes suggests its spectral class is in the range B2-B5 V. This companion would make Beta Lyrae A a hierarchical triple system.

== Variability ==
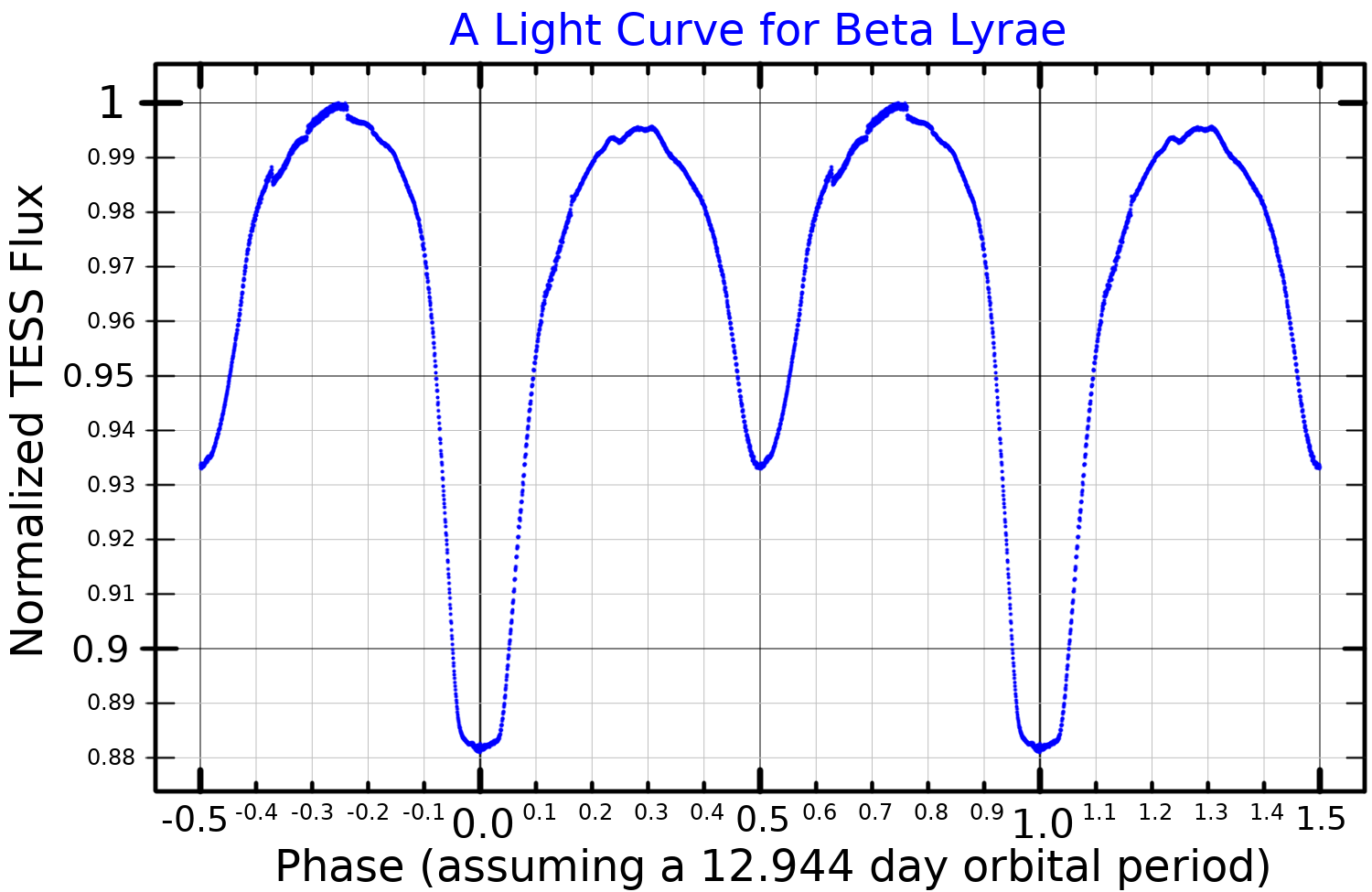
A light curve for Beta Lyrae, plotted from TESS data

The variable luminosity of this system was discovered in 1784 by the British amateur astronomer John Goodricke. In 1894, Aristarkh Belopolsky identified Beta Lyrae as an eclipsing spectroscopic binary. The orbital plane of this system is nearly aligned with the line of sight from the Earth, so the two stars periodically eclipse each other. This causes Beta Lyrae to regularly change its apparent magnitude from +3.2 to +4.4 over an orbital period of 12.9414 days. It forms the prototype of a class of ellipsoidal "contact" eclipsing binaries.

The two components are so close together that they cannot be resolved with optical telescopes, forming a spectroscopic binary. In 2008, the primary star and the accretion disk of the secondary star were resolved and imaged using the CHARA Array interferometer and the Michigan InfraRed Combiner (MIRC) in the near infrared H band (see video below), allowing the orbital elements to be computed for the first time.

In addition to the regular eclipses, the system shows smaller and slower variations in brightness. These are thought to be caused by changes in the accretion disc and are accompanied by variation in the profile and strength of spectral lines, particularly the emission lines. The variations are not regular but have been characterised with a period of 282 days.

The date of a primary minimum can be calculated according the following formula:

Primary_Minimum = 2436793.48 + 12.93095*n + 0.00000386*n*n

whereby n is a natural number. The calculated date is given in Julian days.

== Companions ==
In addition to Beta Lyrae A, several other companions have been catalogued. β Lyr B, at an angular separation of 45.7", is of spectral type B7V, has an apparent magnitude of +7.2, and can easily be seen with binoculars. It is about 80 times as luminous as the Sun. In 1962 it was identified as spectroscopic binary with a period of 4.348 days, but the 2004 release of the SB9 catalog of Spectroscopic Binary Orbits omitted it, so it is now considered a single star.

The next two brightest components are E and F. β Lyr E is magnitude 10.1v, separation 67", and β Lyr F is magnitude 10.6v, separation 86". Both are chemically peculiar stars; both are catalogued as Ap stars, although component F is sometimes thought to be an Am star.

The Washington Double Star Catalog lists two fainter companions, C and D, at 47" and 64" separation, respectively. Component C has been observed to vary in brightness by over a magnitude, but the type of variability is not known.

Components A, B, and F are thought to be members of a group of stars around β Lyrae, at approximately the same distance and moving together. The others just happen to be in the same line of sight. Analysis of Gaia Data Release 2 astrometry reveals a group of about 100 stars around β Lyrae which share its space motion and are at the same distance. This cluster has been named Gaia 8. The cluster members are all main sequence stars and the lack of a main sequence turnoff means that a precise age cannot be calculated, but the cluster age is estimated at 30 to 100 million years. The average Gaia DR2 parallax for the member stars is 3.4 mas.

The Gaia spacecraft has provided these data for the stars listed in the WDS:

| Component | Spectral Class | Magnitude (G) | Proper Motion | | Radial Velocity (km/s) | Parallax (mas) | Simbad |
| Component | Spectral Class | Magnitude (G) | RA (mas/yr) | δ (mas/yr) | Radial Velocity (km/s) | Parallax (mas) | Simbad |
|---|---|---|---|---|---|---|---|
| A (Note: Gaia DR2 astrometric quality considered to be "terrible" for β Lyr A) | | 3.25 – 4.36 | 2.045 ± 0.18 | -3.685 ± 0.2069 | 2.20 ± 0.7 | 3.5982 ± 0.1836 | |
| B | B7V | 7.19 | 2.174 ± 0.09 | -1.272 ± 0.1039 | -14 ± 5 | 3.5125 ± 0.0898 | |
| C | B2 | 13.07 | -1.936 ± 0.01 | -1.934 ± 0.0129 | ? | 0.2884 ± 0.0104 | |
| D | K3V | 14.96 | 0.024 ± 0.034 | -17.781 ± 0.0409 | ? | 0.845 ± 0.0333 | |
| E | G5 | 9.77 | 1.841 ± 0.015 | 0.536 ± 0.0159 | 1.4 | 1.5737 ± 0.0155 | |
| F | G5 | 10.10 | 1.416 ± 0.013 | -3.963 ± 0.0149 | -16.83 ± 1.41 | 3.4897 ± 0.0133 | |
