= 16 Lyrae =

Astrometric binary star system in the constellation Lyra

Observation data Epoch J2000.0 Equinox J2000.0
- Constellation: Lyra
- Right ascension: 19^{h} 01^{m} 26.38262^{s}
- Declination: +46° 56′ 05.1475″
- Apparent magnitude (V): 5.00

Characteristics
- Evolutionary stage: main sequence
- Spectral type: A6 IV or A7 V
- B−V color index: +0.186±0.005

Astrometry
Radial velocity (R_{v})	+4.36±0.21 km/s
Proper motion (μ)	RA: +22.004 mas/yr Dec.: −80.894 mas/yr
Parallax (π)	25.7832±0.0688 mas
Distance	126.5 ± 0.3 ly (38.8 ± 0.1 pc)
Absolute magnitude (M_{V})	+2.13

Details
Mass	1.722±0.013 M_{☉}
Radius	1.644+0.025 −0.023 (equatorial); 1.622+0.023 −0.022 (polar) R_{☉}
Luminosity	10.45+0.30 −0.28 L_{☉}
Surface gravity (log g)	4.28 cgs
Temperature	8,028 (equator); 8,242 (polar) K
Rotational velocity (v sin i)	85.1+16.3 −31.6 km/s
Age	401+31 −32 Myr

Other designations
- 16 Lyr, NSV 11677, BD+46°2602, HD 177196, HIP 93408, HR 7215, SAO 48011, WDS J19014+4656A, GSC 03545-03041

Database references
SIMBAD	data

16 Lyrae is a suspected astrometric binary star system in the constellation Lyra, located 126 light years away from the Sun based on parallax. It is visible to the naked eye as a dim, white-hued star with a combined apparent visual magnitude of 5.00. The system is moving further away from the Earth with a heliocentric radial velocity of +4.36 km/s. It is a suspected member of the Ursa Major Moving Group stream.

Cowley et al. (1969) found a stellar classification of A7 V for the visible component, matching an A-type main-sequence star that is generating energy through hydrogen fusion at its core. Abt and Morrell (1995) instead listed a class of A6 IV, suggesting it has left the main sequence and become a subgiant star.

16 Lyrae is 72% more massive than the Sun and irradiates 10.5 times the Sun's luminosity. It is 401 million years old with a high rate of spin, showing a projected rotational velocity of 85 km/s. The fast rotation make this star slightly oblate, with an equatorial radius of 1.644 R_{☉} and a polar radius of 1.622 R_{☉}. Its effective temperature also vary across its surface due to rotation, from 8,200 K in the poles to 8,000 K in the equator.

This system is a source for X-ray emission with a luminosity of 105.3×10^{20} W, which is most likely coming from the unseen companion.
