= Zeta2 Lyrae =

Star in the constellation Lyra

Zeta^{2} Lyrae
- Location of ζ^{2} Lyrae (circled in red)

Observation data Epoch J2000 Equinox J2000
- Constellation: Lyra
- Right ascension: 18^{h} 44^{m} 48.19919^{s}
- Declination: +37° 35′ 40.5585″
- Apparent magnitude (V): 5.74

Characteristics
- Spectral type: F0 IVn or F1Vnn
- U−B color index: +0.06
- B−V color index: +0.29

Astrometry
Radial velocity (R_{v})	−25.0±3.7 km/s
Proper motion (μ)	RA: +23.969 mas/yr Dec.: +23.461 mas/yr
Parallax (π)	20.6386±0.0443 mas
Distance	158.0 ± 0.3 ly (48.5 ± 0.1 pc)
Absolute magnitude (M_{V})	+2.34

Details
Mass	1.74 M_{☉}
Radius	2.03±0.02 R_{☉}
Luminosity	9.5±0.1 L_{☉}
Surface gravity (log g)	3.94 cgs
Temperature	7,257+37 −3 K
Metallicity [Fe/H]	−0.36 dex
Rotational velocity (v sin i)	212 km/s
Age	1.223 Gyr

Other designations
- Urquchillay, ζ^{2} Lyr, 7 Lyr, BD+37°3223, GC 25678, HD 173649, HIP 91973, HR 7057, SAO 67324, WDS J18448+3736D

Database references
SIMBAD	data

Zeta^{2} Lyrae, also named Urquchillay, is a single, white-hued star in the northern constellation of Lyra. It is a dim star that is just visible to the naked eye with an apparent visual magnitude of 5.74 An annual parallax shift of 20.6 mas as seen from Earth provides a distance estimate of about 158 light years from the Sun. It is moving closer to the Sun with a radial velocity of −25 km/s.

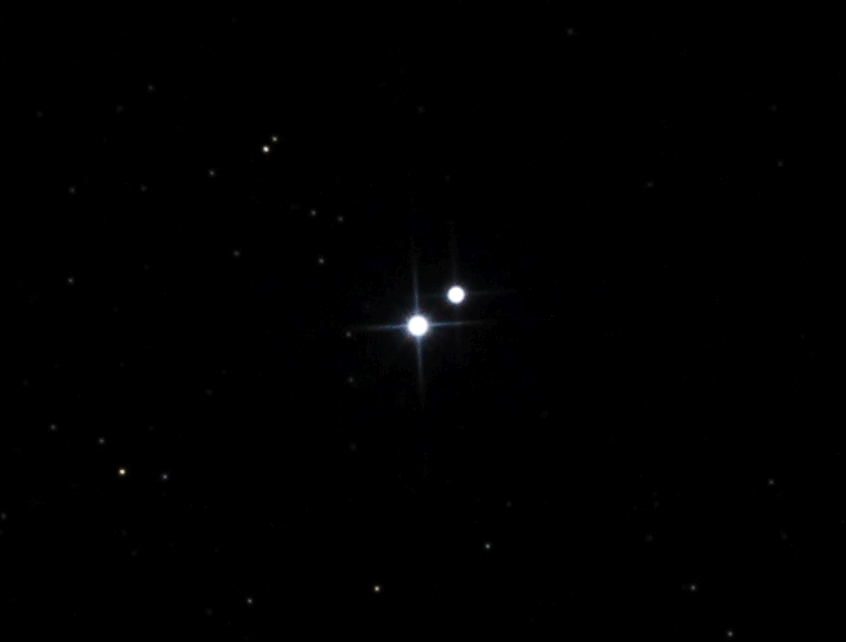
ζ^{1} and ζ^{2} Lyrae photographed by amateur astronomer David Chifiriuc in 2020. The separation between the two stars is 43.7″.

This star has a stellar classification of F0 IVn, suggesting it is an F-type subgiant star that is evolving away from the main sequence as its supply of hydrogen at the core has been consumed. The n suffix indicates "nebulous" lines caused by its rotation. It is spinning rapidly with a projected rotational velocity of 212 km/s. This is giving the star an oblate shape with an equatorial bulge that is an estimated 29% larger than the polar radius. The star is radiating approximately 9.6 times the Sun's luminosity from the photosphere at an effective temperature of about 7,000 K. It has 1.7 times the mass of the Sun, twice the Sun's radius, and is about 1.2 billion years old. It is a suspected variable.

In Inca mythology, Urquchillay is the god of livestock and wildlife, depicted as a multicolored llama and visualized in the constellation Lyra. The IAU Working Group on Star Names adopted the name Urquchillay for this star on 18 June 2026.
