= Kappa Lyrae =

Star in the constellation Lyra

- Location of κ Lyrae (circled)

Observation data Epoch J2000 Equinox J2000
- Constellation: Lyra
- Right ascension: 18^{h} 19^{m} 51.70908^{s}
- Declination: +36° 03′ 52.3691″
- Apparent magnitude (V): 4.33

Characteristics
- Evolutionary stage: red clump
- Spectral type: K2-IIIabCN0.5
- U−B color index: +1.17
- B−V color index: +1.162±0.013
- Variable type: suspected

Astrometry
Radial velocity (R_{v})	−24.36±0.13 km/s
Proper motion (μ)	RA: −16.75 mas/yr Dec.: +41.09 mas/yr
Parallax (π)	12.96±0.14 mas
Distance	252 ± 3 ly (77.2 ± 0.8 pc)
Absolute magnitude (M_{V})	−0.11

Details
Radius	18 R_{☉}
Luminosity	127.4 L_{☉}
Surface gravity (log g)	2.51 cgs
Temperature	4,638 K
Metallicity [Fe/H]	+0.13 dex
Rotational velocity (v sin i)	5.0 km/s

Other designations
- κ Lyr, 1 Lyrae, BD+36°3094, HD 168775, HIP 89826, HR 6872, SAO 66869

Database references
SIMBAD	data

κ Lyrae, Latinized as Kappa Lyrae, is a solitary star in the northern constellation of Lyra, near the constellation border with Hercules. It is visible to the naked eye as a faint, orange-hued point of light with an apparent visual magnitude of 4.33. This object is located approximately 252 light years from the Sun based on parallax, but is moving closer with a radial velocity of −24 km/s.

This is an aging giant star with a stellar classification of K2-IIIabCN0.5, with the suffix notation indicating a mild underabundance of cyanogen. Having exhausted the supply of hydrogen at its core, the star has cooled and expanded. It now has 18 times the Sun's girth and is radiating 127 times the luminosity of the Sun at an effective temperature of 4,638 K. κ Lyrae is a red clump giant, which means it is on the horizontal branch and is generating energy through core helium fusion. It is a suspected small amplitude variable star.
