= Nu2 Lyrae =

Star in the constellation Lyra

ν^{2} Lyrae
- Location of ν^{2} Lyrae (circled)

Observation data Epoch J2000.0 Equinox J2000.0 (ICRS)
- Constellation: Lyra
- Right ascension: 18^{h} 49^{m} 52.91732^{s}
- Declination: +32° 33′ 03.8170″
- Apparent magnitude (V): 5.23

Characteristics
- Spectral type: A3 V
- U−B color index: +0.12
- B−V color index: +0.10

Astrometry
Radial velocity (R_{v})	+6.59±0.29 km/s
Proper motion (μ)	RA: −10.685 mas/yr Dec.: −11.771 mas/yr
Parallax (π)	13.9238±0.0703 mas
Distance	234 ± 1 ly (71.8 ± 0.4 pc)
Absolute magnitude (M_{V})	+0.97

Details
Mass	1.91 M_{☉}
Radius	1.5 R_{☉}
Luminosity	32 L_{☉}
Surface gravity (log g)	3.89±0.14 cgs
Temperature	8,912±303 K
Rotational velocity (v sin i)	128 km/s
Age	214 Myr

Other designations
- ν^{2} Lyr, 9 Lyr, BD+32°3228, HD 174602, HIP 92405, HR 7102, SAO 67446.

Database references
SIMBAD	data

Nu^{2} Lyrae, Latinized from ν^{2} Lyrae, or sometimes simply Nu Lyrae, is a solitary star in the northern constellation of Lyra. Based upon an annual parallax shift of 13.92 mas as seen from Earth, it is located around 234 light years from the Sun. With an apparent visual magnitude of 5.23, it is bright enough to be faintly visible to the naked eye.

This is a white-hued A-type main sequence star with a stellar classification of A3 V. At an estimated age of 214 million years, it is spinning with a projected rotational velocity of 128 km/s. This is giving the star an oblate shape with an equatorial bulge that is 5% larger than the polar radius. Nu^{2} Lyrae has an estimated 1.9 times the mass of the Sun and about 1.5 times the Sun's radius. It is radiating 32 times the solar luminosity from its photosphere at an effective temperature of around 8,912 K.
