= R Lyrae =

Star in the constellation Lyra

- Location of R Lyrae (labelled as 13)

Observation data Epoch J2000.0 Equinox ICRS
- Constellation: Lyra
- Right ascension: 18^{h} 55^{m} 20.101223^{s}
- Declination: +43° 56′ 45.9215″
- Apparent magnitude (V): 3.9 - 5.0

Characteristics
- Evolutionary stage: AGB
- Spectral type: M5 III
- Apparent magnitude (J): −0.90
- U−B color index: +1.41
- B−V color index: +1.59
- Variable type: SRb

Astrometry
Radial velocity (R_{v})	−27.15 km/s
Proper motion (μ)	RA: 21.05 mas/yr Dec.: 82.06 mas/yr
Parallax (π)	10.94±0.12 mas
Distance	298 ± 3 ly (91 ± 1 pc)
Absolute magnitude (M_{V})	−1.1

Details
Mass	1.8±0.2 M_{☉}
Radius	195 (Note: Applying the Stefan–Boltzmann law with a nominal solar effective temperature of 5,772 K: $$\sqrt{\biggl(\frac{5,772}{3,313}\biggr)^4 \cdot 4,130} = 195\ R_\odot$$.) R_{☉}
Luminosity	4,130 (Note: Calculated using the absolute bolometric magnitude of R lyrae, with respect to the Sun's absolute bolometric magnitude of 4.83: 10^{0.4(4.74+(−4.3)} = 4130.48.) L_{☉}
Surface gravity (log g)	0.47 cgs
Temperature	3,313 K

Other designations
- Niandao, 13 Lyr, R Lyr, BD+43°3117, GC 25996, HD 175865, HIP 92862, HR 7157, SAO 47919, GSC 03131-02155

Database references
SIMBAD	data

R Lyrae, also known by its Flamsteed designation 13 Lyrae and named Niandao, is a 4th magnitude semiregular variable star in the constellation Lyra, approximately 350 light-years away from Earth. It is visible to the naked eye. It is a red giant star of the spectral type M5III, currently at the last stages of evolution. It is much larger and brighter, yet cooler, than the Sun. In the near-infrared J band, it is brighter than the nearby Vega.

R Lyrae is unusual in that it is a red star with a high proper motion, greater than 50 milliarcseconds a year. It is one of the brightest stars at the K band, having an apparent magnitude of −2.08, only 14 stars are brighter.

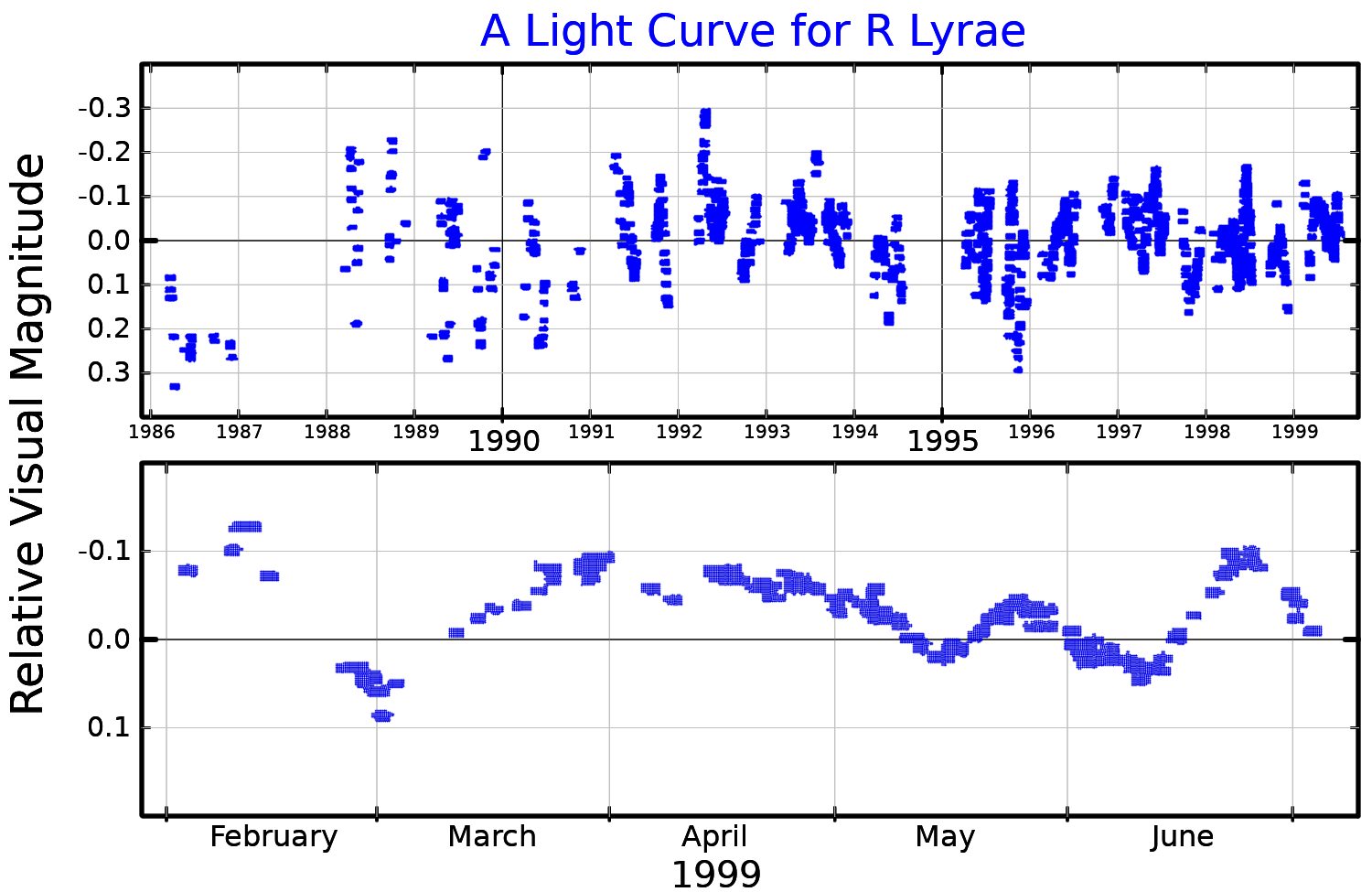
Visual band light curves for R Lyrae, adapted from Percy et al. (2001)

In 1856, Joseph Baxendell announced that the star, then called 13 Lyrae, is a variable star. In 1907 it appeared with its variable star designation, R Lyrae, in Annie Jump Cannon's Second Catalog of Variable Stars. The variability is not consistent and regular, but periods of 46, 64, 378, and 1,000 days have been reported, with the 46-day period being the strongest.

It is calculated that R Lyrae was a 2.0 M_{☉} star on the main sequence, similar to Sirius A today. It is now an oxygen-rich asymptotic giant branch star, with both hydrogen and helium shells fusing. Due to stellar mass loss, R Lyrae now has a mass of 1.8 M_{☉}.

In Chinese astronomy, this star is part of the asterism Niǎn Dào (Imperial Passageway, 辇道). The IAU Working Group on Star Names adopted the name Niandao for this star on 18 June 2026.
