= Lambda Lyrae =

Suspected binary star system in the constellation Lyra

- Location of λ Lyrae (circled in red)

Observation data Epoch J2000.0 Equinox J2000.0
- Constellation: Lyra
- Right ascension: 19^{h} 00^{m} 00.82534^{s}
- Declination: +32° 8′ 43.8418″
- Apparent magnitude (V): 4.937

Characteristics
- Spectral type: K2.5III:Ba0.5
- U−B color index: +1.609
- B−V color index: +1.455

Astrometry
Radial velocity (R_{v})	−17.69±0.02 km/s
Proper motion (μ)	RA: 6.526 mas/yr Dec.: 9.765 mas/yr
Parallax (π)	2.4502±0.2016 mas
Distance	1,300 ± 100 ly (410 ± 30 pc)
Absolute magnitude (M_{V})	−3.75+0.65 −0.50

Details
Mass	6.3±0.8 M_{☉}
Radius	104.74±8.84 R_{☉}
Luminosity	3,561±611 L_{☉}
Surface gravity (log g)	2.21 cgs
Temperature	4,361±68 K
Metallicity [Fe/H]	−0.02 dex
Rotational velocity (v sin i)	3.2±1.0 km/s
Age	58.4±22.6 Myr

Other designations
- λ Lyr, 15 Lyrae, BD+31°3424, HD 176670, HIP 93279, HR 7192, SAO 67682

Database references
SIMBAD	data

λ Lyrae, Latinized as Lambda Lyrae, is a suspected binary star system in the northern constellation of Lyra. It is an orange-hued point of light that is dimly visible to the naked eye with an apparent visual magnitude of 4.94. The system is located approximately 1,300 light years distant from the Sun based on parallax, but is drifting closer with a radial velocity of −17.7 km/s.

The visible component is an aging giant star with a stellar classification of K2.5III:Ba0.5 and an estimated age of around 58 million years. The suffix notation indicates this is a mild barium star and hence it may have a white dwarf companion, while the colon indicates there is some uncertainty about the class. Having exhausted the supply of hydrogen at its core, it has cooled and expanded off the main sequence, and now has 105 times the radius of the Sun. The star has six times the mass of the Sun and is radiating over 4,300 times the Sun's luminosity from its swollen photosphere at an effective temperature of 4,361 K.
