= Nu1 Lyrae =

Star in the constellation Lyra

ν^{1} Lyrae
- Location of ν^{1} Lyrae (circled in red)

Observation data Epoch J2000.0 Equinox J2000.0 (ICRS)
- Constellation: Lyra
- Right ascension: 18^{h} 49^{m} 45.91823^{s}
- Declination: +32° 48′ 46.1464″
- Apparent magnitude (V): 5.91

Characteristics
- Spectral type: B3 IV
- U−B color index: −0.71
- B−V color index: −0.16
- Variable type: Suspected

Astrometry
Radial velocity (R_{v})	−26.30±1.2 km/s
Proper motion (μ)	RA: +1.540 mas/yr Dec.: −3.721 mas/yr
Parallax (π)	2.6879±0.0507 mas
Distance	1,210 ± 20 ly (372 ± 7 pc)
Absolute magnitude (M_{V})	−1.73

Details
Mass	6.9±0.1 M_{☉}
Radius	5.9 R_{☉}
Luminosity	1,460 L_{☉}
Surface gravity (log g)	3.86 cgs
Temperature	14,534 K
Metallicity [Fe/H]	−0.08 dex
Rotational velocity (v sin i)	145 km/s
Age	39.8±3.7 Myr

Other designations
- ν^{1} Lyr, 8 Lyr, BD+32°3227, HD 174585, HIP 92398, HR 7100, SAO 67441

Database references
SIMBAD	data

Nu^{1} Lyrae (ν^{1} Lyrae) is a star in the northern constellation of Lyra. Based upon an annual parallax shift of 2.69 mas as seen from Earth, it is located around 1,210 light years from the Sun. At that distance, the visual magnitude of the star is diminished by an extinction factor of 0.35 due to interstellar dust. With an apparent visual magnitude of 5.91, the star is barely bright enough to be visible with the naked eye on a dark night.

This is a blue-white hued B-type subgiant star with a stellar classification of B3 IV. It is a suspected variable. The star has nearly seven times the mass of the Sun and, at an estimated age of about 40 million years, is spinning with a projected rotational velocity of 145 km/s. It radiates approximately 1460 times the solar luminosity from its photosphere at an effective temperature of 14,534 K.

Nu^{1} Lyrae has five faint visual companions listed in the Washington Double Star Catalog, the nearest being a magnitude 13.0 star at an angular separation of 33.7 arc seconds along a position angle of 76°, as of 2015.
