= Eta Lyrae =

Star in the constellation Lyra

- Location of η Lyrae (circled in red)

Observation data Epoch J2000 Equinox ICRS
- Constellation: Lyra
- Right ascension: 19^{h} 13^{m} 45.48832^{s}
- Declination: +39° 08′ 45.4801″
- Apparent magnitude (V): 4.43

Characteristics
- Spectral type: B2.5IV
- B−V color index: −0.150±0.002

Astrometry
Radial velocity (R_{v})	−8.1±0.9 km/s
Proper motion (μ)	RA: −0.60 mas/yr Dec.: −1.26 mas/yr
Parallax (π)	2.35±0.13 mas
Distance	1,390 ± 80 ly (430 ± 20 pc)
Absolute magnitude (M_{V})	−3.71

Orbit
Period (P)	56.4±0.5 d
Semi-major axis (a)	≥ 1.841 Gm (0.01231 AU)
Eccentricity (e)	0.53±0.12
Periastron epoch (T)	2,441,868.4±3.4 JD
Argument of periastron (ω) (secondary)	337±28°
Semi-amplitude (K_{1}) (primary)	2.8±0.5 km/s

Details
Mass	9.97±0.98 M_{☉} 10.1±1.0 M_{☉}
Radius	4.3 R_{☉}
Luminosity	6,605 L_{☉}
Luminosity (bolometric)	19,095 L_{☉}
Surface gravity (log g)	3.38 cgs
Temperature	17,360 K 19,525 K
Metallicity [Fe/H]	−0.01 dex
Rotational velocity (v sin i)	10 km/s
Age	22.5±2.6 Myr

Other designations
- Aladfar, Eta Lyr or η Lyr, 20 Lyr, BD+38°3490, HD 180163, HIP 94481, HR 7298, SAO 68010, WDS 19138+3909

Database references
SIMBAD	data

Eta Lyrae, a name Latinized from η Lyrae, is a likely binary star system in the northern constellation of Lyra. It has the traditional name Aladfar /əˈlædfɑːr/ and is faintly visible to the naked eye with an apparent visual magnitude of 4.43. The system is located at a distance of approximately 1,390 light years from the Sun based on parallax, but is drifting closer with a radial velocity of −8 km/s.

== Nomenclature ==
η Lyrae (Latinised to Eta Lyrae) is the binary star's Bayer designation. Its designation as the A component of a double star, and of its two constituents as the Aa and Ab components, derives from the convention used by the Washington Multiplicity Catalog (WMC) for multiple star systems, and adopted by the International Astronomical Union (IAU).

'BD +38 3491' is the 'B' component's designation in the Bonner Durchmusterung astrometric star catalogue.

Eta Lyrae bore the traditional name Aladfar, from the Arabic الأظفر al-ʼuẓfur "the talons (of the swooping eagle)", a name it shares with Mu Lyrae (though the latter is typically spelled Alathfar). The Working Group on Star Names (WGSN) has approved the name Aladfar for the Aa component of the system (the primary component of Eta Lyrae).

== Properties ==
The suspected radial velocity variations of this star in 1938 led to it being incorrectly classified as a Beta Cephei-type star, although there was some early disagreement about the variation. In 1951, J. A. Pearce and R. M. Petrie also noted that the star appeared to have a variable radial velocity. It was announced as a binary system by H. A. Abt and S. G. Levy in 1978, who listed it as a single-lined spectroscopic binary, albeit with marginal elements. The putative components have an orbital period of 56 days with an eccentricity (ovalness) of 0.5 and a small radial velocity variation of 2.8 km/s.

The visible component of this system is a massive B-type star with a stellar classification of B2.5IV. It is around 23 million years old with ten times the mass of the Sun and a low rotational velocity. The star is radiating around 19,095 times the luminosity of the Sun from its photosphere at an effective temperature of 19,525 K. A magnetic field has been detected with an average quadratic field strength of (169.0±115.9)×10^{−4} T.

The magnitude 8.58 star BD +38 3491 forms a visual companion to this pair. It is designated Eta Lyrae B in the Washington Double Star Catalog, and is located at an angular separation of 28.40 arcseconds along a position angle of 81°, as of 2017.
