= Epsilon Lyrae =

Multiple star system in the constellation of Lyra

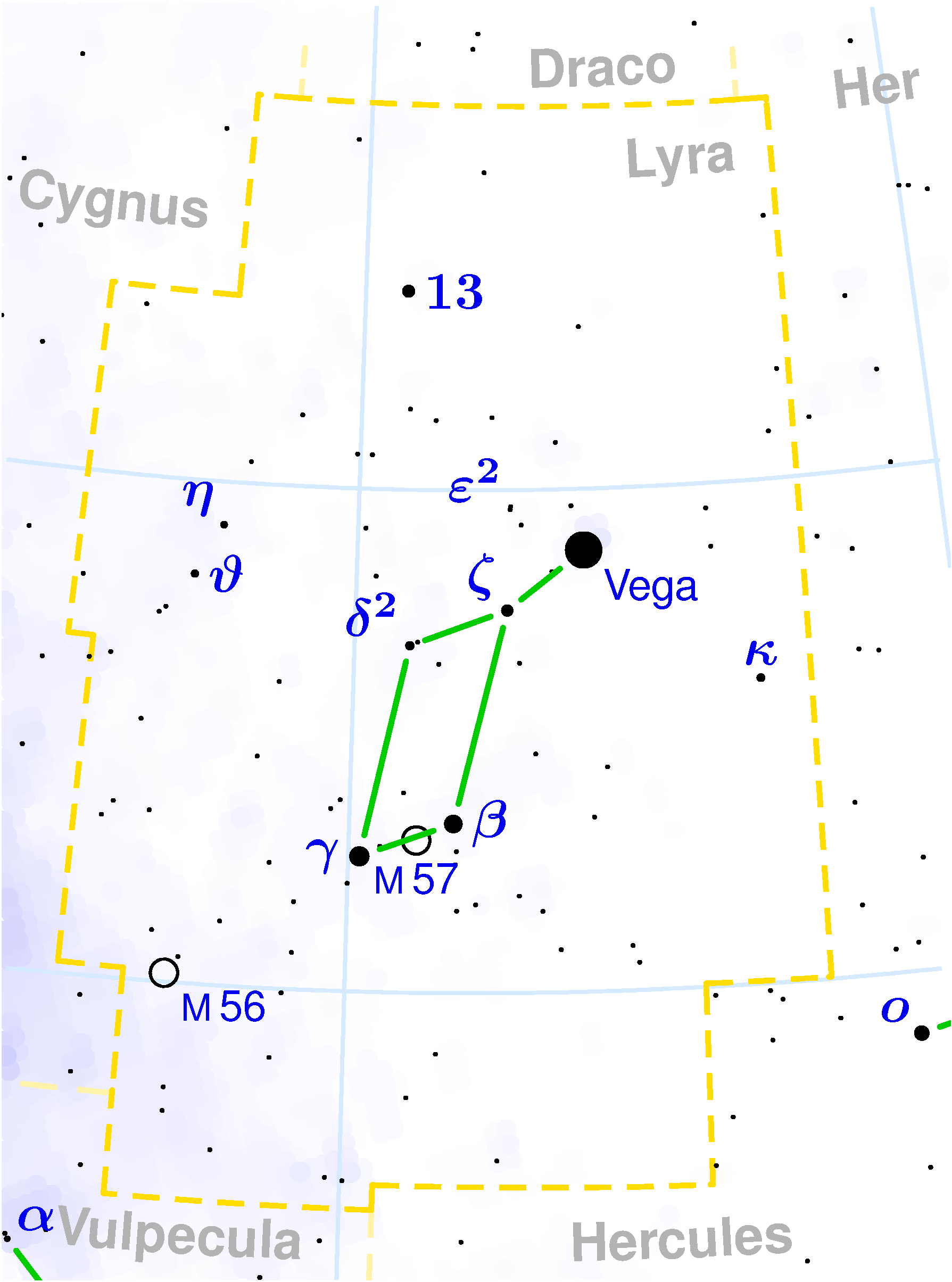
- ε (circled) in the constellation Lyra.

Observation data Epoch J2000.0 Equinox J2000.0
- Constellation: Lyra
- Epsilon^{1} Lyrae
- Right ascension: 18^{h} 44^{m} 20.34589^{s}
- Declination: +39° 40′ 12.4533″
- Apparent magnitude (V): 4.66
- Epsilon^{2} Lyrae
- Right ascension: 18^{h} 44^{m} 22.78056^{s}
- Declination: +39° 36′ 45.7851″
- Apparent magnitude (V): 4.59

Characteristics

ε^{1} Lyr
- Spectral type: A3V + F0V
- U−B color index: +0.065
- B−V color index: +0.16

ε^{2} Lyr
- Spectral type: A6Vn + A7Vn
- U−B color index: +0.075
- B−V color index: +0.18

Astrometry

ε^{1} Lyr
Radial velocity (R_{v})	−31.20 ± 1.7 km/s
Proper motion (μ)	RA: 11.09 mas/yr Dec.: 61.39 mas/yr
Parallax (π)	20.09±0.78 mas
Distance	162 ± 6 ly (50 ± 2 pc)
Absolute magnitude (M_{V})	1.2

ε^{2} Lyr
Radial velocity (R_{v})	−24.40 ± 1.7 km/s
Proper motion (μ)	RA: 6.18 mas/yr Dec.: 50.42 mas/yr
Parallax (π)	20.97±0.50 mas
Distance	156 ± 4 ly (48 ± 1 pc)
Absolute magnitude (M_{V})	1.2

Details

ε^{1} Lyr A
Mass	2.03 M_{☉}
Radius	2.78±0.14 R_{☉}
Luminosity	24 L_{☉}
Temperature	7,943 K
Rotational velocity (v sin i)	165 km/s

ε^{1} Lyr B
Mass	1.61 M_{☉}
Luminosity	8.4 L_{☉}
Temperature	7,047 K
Rotational velocity (v sin i)	159 km/s

ε^{2} Lyr A
Mass	2.11 M_{☉}
Radius	2.08 R_{☉}
Luminosity	29 L_{☉}
Surface gravity (log g)	3.7 cgs
Temperature	7,816 K
Metallicity [Fe/H]	-0.75 dex
Rotational velocity (v sin i)	212 km/s
Age	0.83 Gyr

ε^{2} Lyr B
Mass	2.15 M_{☉}
Radius	2.04 R_{☉}
Luminosity	32 L_{☉}
Surface gravity (log g)	3.97 cgs
Temperature	7,852 K
Metallicity [Fe/H]	-0.63 dex
Rotational velocity (v sin i)	233 km/s
Age	1.01 Gyr

Other designations
- Double Double, ADS 11635, WDS J18443+3940
- ε^{1} Lyr: 4 Lyr, BD+39°3509, HIP 91919
- ε^{1} Lyr A: Pongaponga, HD 173582, HR 7051, SAO 67310
- ε^{1} Lyr B: HD 173583, HR 7052, SAO 67309

Other designations
- ε^{2} Lyr: 5 Lyr, BD+39°3510, HIP 91926
- ε^{2} Lyr A: HD 173607, HR 7053, SAO 67315
- ε^{2} Lyr B: HD 173608, HR 7054

Database references
SIMBAD	ε^{1} Lyr
- ε^{1} Lyr A
- ε^{1} Lyr B
- ε^{2} Lyr
- ε^{2} Lyr A
- ε^{2} Lyr B

Epsilon Lyrae (ε Lyr, ε Lyrae) is a multiple star system of at least five stars approximately 160 light-years away in the constellation of Lyra. It is nicknamed the Double Double, and the primary component has the proper name Pongaponga, from a traditional name for the system.

== Nomenclature ==
Epsilon Lyrae (Latinized from ε Lyrae, abbreviated ε Lyr) is the system's Bayer designation. The main components of the system (each themselves binary) are designated ε^{1} Lyrae and ε^{2} Lyrae.

On Pukapuka in the Cook Islands, ε Lyrae has the traditional name Na ponga-ponga-iyu-o-te-kiole, "the nostrils of the rat". The shortened form Pongaponga ("nostrils") was adopted as a name for the primary component, ε^{1} Lyrae A, on 18 June 2026 by the IAU Working Group on Star Names.

== Star system ==
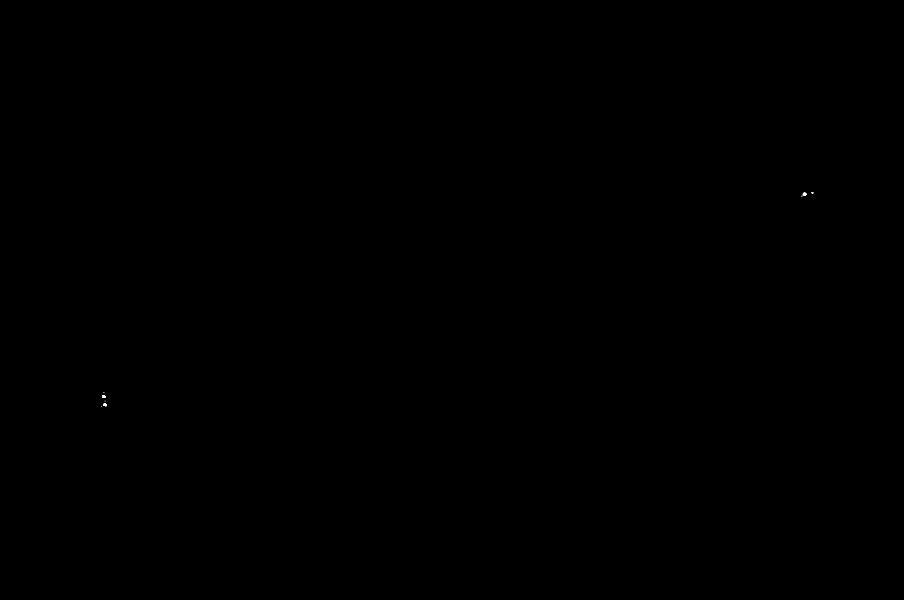
Epsilon Lyrae, the Double Double

The widest two components of the system are easily separated when viewed through binoculars, or even with the naked eye under excellent conditions.

The northern component is called ε^{1} (ADS 11635 AB in multiple star notation) and the southern ε^{2} (ADS 11635 CD); they lie around 160 light years from Earth and orbit each other over hundreds of thousands of years. Their separation of 208″ is about one hundred times that of the subcomponents. When viewed at higher magnifications, each intuitively likely "star" proves to be a set of shorter-term, close-orbiting binary stars. Ability to view these sub-components is a common benchmark for the resolving power of telescopes, since they are so close together: the stars of ε^{1} were 2.35 arc-seconds apart in 2006, those of ε^{2} were separated by about the same amount in that year. Since the first high-precision measurements of their orbit in the 1980s, both binaries have moved only a few degrees in position angle.

The component stars of ε^{1} have magnitudes of 4.7 and 6.2 separated by 2.6" and have an orbital period that can only be crudely estimated at 1200 years, which places them at roughly 140 AU apart. Main components of ε^{2} have magnitudes 5.1 and 5.5 separated by 2.3", and orbit in perhaps half that period. ε^{1} and ε^{2} are more than 0.16 light years apart. An observer at one pair would see the other as strongly as a quarter-illuminated Moon (which is about mv = −5.0), less than a degree away from each other.

In 2022, researchers at MarSEC (Marana Space Explorer Center) thanks to data from the TESS (Transiting Exoplanet Survey Satellite) discovered that the secondary component of ε^{1}is a variable star of the type Gamma Doradus with a main period of 0.415 days.

The fifth component of this system, orbiting one of the ε^{2} pair, was detected by speckle interferometry in 1985 and confirmed in two later observations. No orbit can be prepared from such limited data, but its rapid motion suggests a period of a few tens of years. Its maximum observed separation of 0.2 arc-seconds precludes direct visual observation.

A further five nearby dimmer stars are also listed in multiple star catalogues:

Multiple star components
	Magnitude	Spectral Type
A	5.15	A2
B	6.10	A4
C	5.25	A3
D	5.38	A5
E	11.71	
F	11.2	
G	13.83	
H	13.22	
I	10.43	
Cb	?	

Orbit pairs
	Separation (arcsec)	Separation (au)	Most Recent Position Angle	Period (years)	Semi-major axis (arcseconds)	Notes
AB-CD	208.2	10,500	172			ε^{1}-ε^{2}
AB	2.3	116	347	1804.41	4.742	components of ε^{1}
CD	2.4	121	79	724.307	2.92	components of ε^{2}
Ca-Cb	0.1	5	225			recently discovered interferometric companion
