= Lyra =

Constellation in the northern celestial hemisphere

- Constellation
- List of stars in Lyra
- Abbreviation: Lyr
- Genitive: Lyrae
- Pronunciation: /ˈlaɪrə/, genitive /ˈlaɪriː/
- Symbolism: Lyre
- Right ascension: 18^{h} 14^{m} –19^{h} 28^{m}
- Declination: 25.66°–47.71°
- Quadrant: NQ4
- Area: 286 sq. deg. (52nd)
- Main stars: 5
- Bayer/Flamsteed stars: 25
- Stars brighter than 3.00^{m}: 1 (Vega)
- Stars within 10.00 pc (32.62 ly): 3 (Note: The nearby stars are Vega, the red dwarf double star GJ 747, and the brown dwarf 2MASS 1835+3259.)
- Brightest star: Vega (α Lyr) (0.03^{m})
- Nearest star: LSR J1835+3259
- Messier objects: 2
- Meteor showers: Lyrids; June Lyrids; Alpha Lyrids
- Bordering constellations: Draco; Hercules; Vulpecula; Cygnus
- Visible at latitudes between +90° and −40°. Best visible at 21:00 (9 p.m.) during the month of August.

Lyra (Latin for 'lyre', from Ancient Greek: λύρα; pronounced: /ˈlaɪrə/ LY-rə) is a small constellation in the Northern Sky. It is one of the 48 listed by the 2nd century astronomer Ptolemy, and is one of the 88 modern constellations recognized by the International Astronomical Union. Lyra was often represented on star maps as a vulture or an eagle carrying a lyre, and hence is sometimes referred to as Vultur Cadens or Aquila Cadens ("Falling Vulture" or "Falling Eagle", respectively). Beginning at the north, Lyra is bordered by Draco, Hercules, Vulpecula, and Cygnus. Lyra is nearly overhead in temperate northern latitudes shortly after midnight at the start of summer. From the equator to about the 40th parallel south it is visible low in the northern sky during the same (thus winter) months.

Lyra's brightest star, Vega, is one of the night sky's brightest stars and forms a corner of the Summer Triangle asterism. Beta Lyrae is the prototype of a class of binary stars and Epsilon Lyrae is a complex multiple star system. Lyra also hosts the Ring Nebula, the second-discovered and best-known planetary nebula.

== History and mythology ==
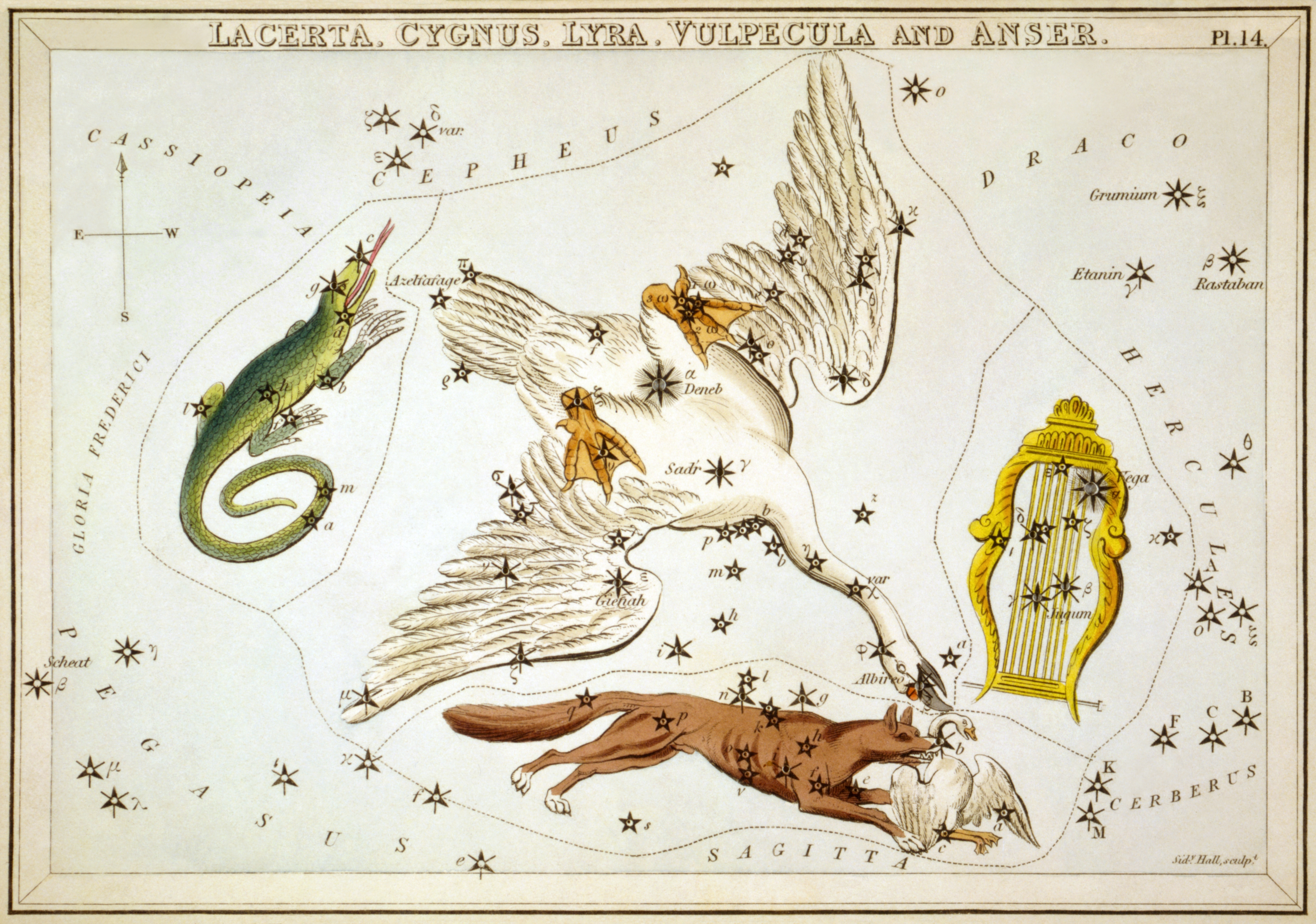
Lyra can be seen on the right of this c. 1825 star map from Urania's Mirror.

In Greek mythology, Lyra represents the lyre of Orpheus. Orpheus's music was said to be so great that even inanimate objects such as rocks could be charmed. Joining Jason and the Argonauts, his music was able to quell the voices of the dangerous Sirens, who sang tempting songs to the Argonauts.

At one point, Orpheus married Eurydice, a nymph. While fleeing from an attack by Aristaeus, she stepped on a snake that bit her, killing her. To reclaim her, Orpheus entered the Underworld, where the music from his lyre charmed Hades, the god of the Underworld. Hades relented and let Orpheus bring Eurydice back, on the condition that he never once look back until outside. Unfortunately, near the very end, Orpheus faltered and looked back, causing Eurydice to be left in the Underworld forever. Orpheus spent the rest of his life strumming his lyre while wandering aimlessly through the land, rejecting all marriage offers from women.

There are two main competing myths relating to the death of Orpheus. According to Eratosthenes, Orpheus failed to make a necessary sacrifice to Dionysus due to his regard for Apollo as the supreme deity instead. Dionysus then sent his followers to rip Orpheus apart. Ovid tells a rather different story, saying that women, in retribution for Orpheus's rejection of marriage offers, ganged up and threw stones and spears. At first, his music charmed them as well, but eventually their numbers and clamor overwhelmed his music and he was hit by the spears. Both myths then state that his lyre was placed in the sky by Zeus and Orpheus's bones were buried by the muses. In a third myth, he was killed by the Thracian women because he looked on the rites of Father Liber (Dionysus).

The Roman book De astronomia, attributed to Hyginus, also records another myth about Lyra, which said that it belonged to Theseus "for he was skilful in all the arts and seems to have learned the lyre as well". The book reports that the neighbouring constellation now known as Hercules was said to depict many different mythical figures, including Theseus, Orpheus, or the musician Thamyris. The proximity of these two constellations and Corona Borealis (perhaps a symbol of Theseus' royalty) could indicate that the three constellations were invented as a group.

Vega and its surrounding stars are also treated as a constellation in other cultures. The area corresponding to Lyra was seen by the Arabs as a vulture or an eagle diving with folded wings. In Wales, Lyra is known as King Arthur's Harp (Talyn Arthur), and King David's harp. The Persian Hafiz called it the Lyre of Zurah. It has been called the Manger of the Infant Saviour, Praesepe Salvatoris. In Australian Aboriginal astronomy, Lyra is known by the Boorong people in Victoria as the Malleefowl constellation. Lyra was known as Urcuchillay by the Incas and was worshipped as an animal deity.

== Characteristics ==
Lyra is bordered by Vulpecula to the south, Hercules to the west, Draco to the north, and Cygnus to the east. Covering 286.5 square degrees, it ranks 52nd of the 88 modern constellations in size. It appears prominently in the northern sky during the Northern Hemisphere's summer, and the whole constellation is visible for at least part of the year to observers north of latitude 42°S. (Note: While parts of the constellation technically rise above the horizon to observers between 42°S and 64°S, stars within a few degrees of the horizon are to all intents and purposes unobservable.) Its main asterism consists of six stars, (Note: Assuming the visual binary Epsilon is counted as single stars, and only one of Delta1 and Delta2 Lyrae is counted as part of the pattern.) and 73 stars in total are brighter than magnitude 6.5. The constellation's boundaries, as set by Belgian astronomer Eugène Delporte in 1930, are defined by a 17-sided polygon. In the equatorial coordinate system, the right ascension coordinates of these borders lie between 18^{h} 14^{m} and 19^{h} 28^{m} , while the declination coordinates are between +25.66° and +47.71°. The International Astronomical Union (IAU) adopted the three-letter abbreviation "Lyr" for the constellation in 1922.

== Features ==
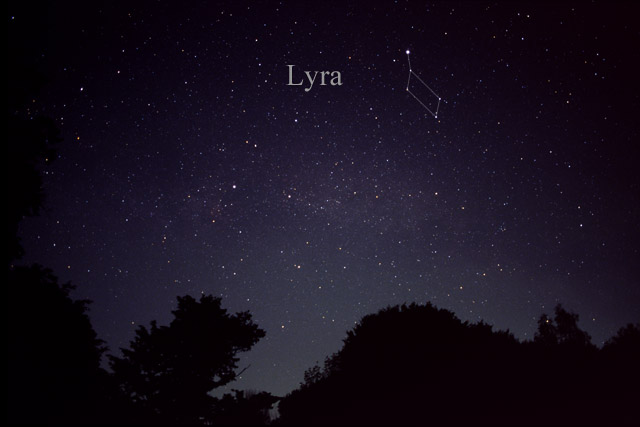
Lyra in the night sky

=== Stars ===
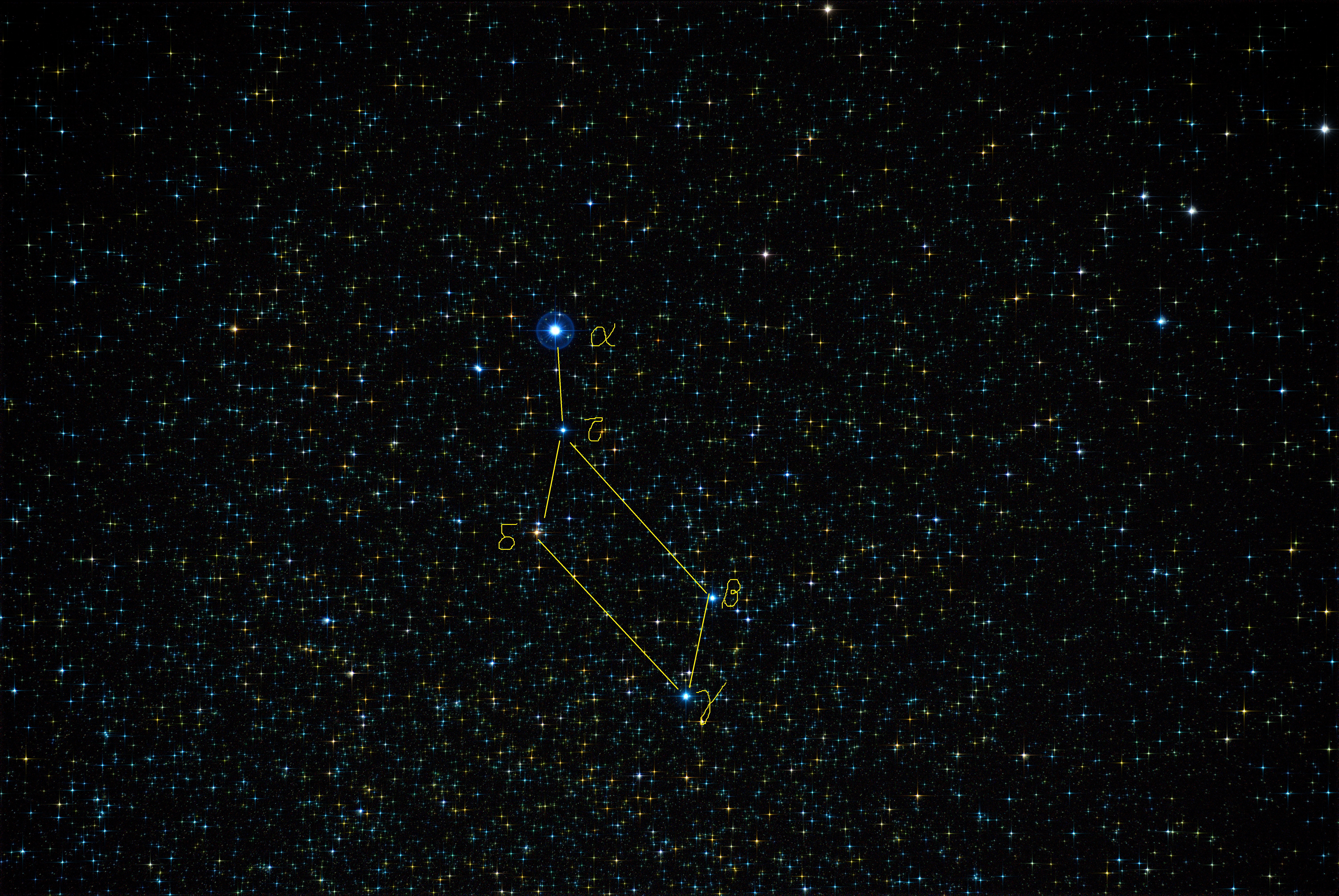
Lyra, enhanced for color and contrast and with the brightest five stars labeled

German cartographer Johann Bayer used the Greek letters alpha through nu to label the most prominent stars in the constellation. English astronomer John Flamsteed observed and labelled two stars each as delta, epsilon, zeta and nu. He added pi and rho, not using xi and omicron as Bayer used these letters to denote Cygnus and Hercules on his map.

The brightest star in the constellation is Vega (Alpha Lyrae), a main-sequence star of spectral type A0Va. Only 7.7 parsecs distant, Vega is a Delta Scuti variable, varying between magnitudes −0.02 and 0.07 over 0.2 days. On average, it is the second-brightest star of the northern hemisphere (after Arcturus) and the fifth-brightest star in all, surpassed only by Arcturus, Alpha Centauri, Canopus, and Sirius. Vega was the pole star in the year 12,000 BCE, and will again become the pole star around 14,000 CE.

Vega is one of the most magnificent of all stars, and has been called "arguably the next most important star in the sky after the Sun". Vega was the first star other than the Sun to be photographed, as well as the first to have a clear spectrum recorded, showing absorption lines for the first time. The star was the first single main-sequence star other than the Sun to be known to emit X-rays, and is surrounded by a circumstellar debris disk, similar to the Kuiper Belt. Vega forms one corner of the famous Summer Triangle asterism; along with Altair and Deneb, these three stars form a prominent triangle during the northern hemisphere summer.

Vega also forms one vertex of a much smaller triangle, along with Epsilon and Zeta Lyrae. Zeta forms a wide binary star visible in binoculars, consisting of an Am star and an F-type subgiant. The Am star has an additional close companion, bringing the total number of stars in the system to three. Epsilon is a more famous wide binary that can even be separated by the naked eye under excellent conditions. Both components are themselves close binaries which can be seen with telescopes to consist of A- and F-type stars, and a faint star was recently found to orbit component C as well, for a total of five stars.

In contrast to Zeta and Epsilon Lyrae, Delta Lyrae is an optical double, with the two stars simply lying along the same line of sight east of Zeta. The brighter and closer of the two, Delta^{2} Lyrae, is a 4th-magnitude red bright giant that varies semiregularly by around 0.2 magnitudes with a dominant period of 79 days, while the fainter Delta^{1} Lyrae is a spectroscopic binary consisting of a B-type primary and an unknown secondary. Both systems, however, have very similar radial velocities, and are the two brightest members of a sparse open cluster known as the Delta Lyrae cluster.

South of Delta is Sulafat (Gamma Lyrae), a blue giant and the second-brightest star in the constellation. Around 190 parsecs distant, it has been referred to as a "superficially normal" star.

The final star forming the lyre's figure is Sheliak (Beta Lyrae), also a binary composed of a blue bright giant and an early B-type star. In this case, the stars are so close together that the larger giant is overflowing its Roche lobe and transferring material to the secondary, forming a semidetached system. The secondary, originally the less massive of the two, has accreted so much mass that it is now substantially more massive, albeit smaller, than the primary, and is surrounded by a thick accretion disk. The plane of the orbit is aligned with Earth and the system thus shows eclipses, dropping nearly a full magnitude from its 3rd-magnitude baseline every 13 days, although its period is increasing by around 19 seconds per year. It is the prototype of the Beta Lyrae variables, eclipsing semidetached binaries of early spectral types in which there are no exact onsets of eclipses, but rather continuous changes in brightness.

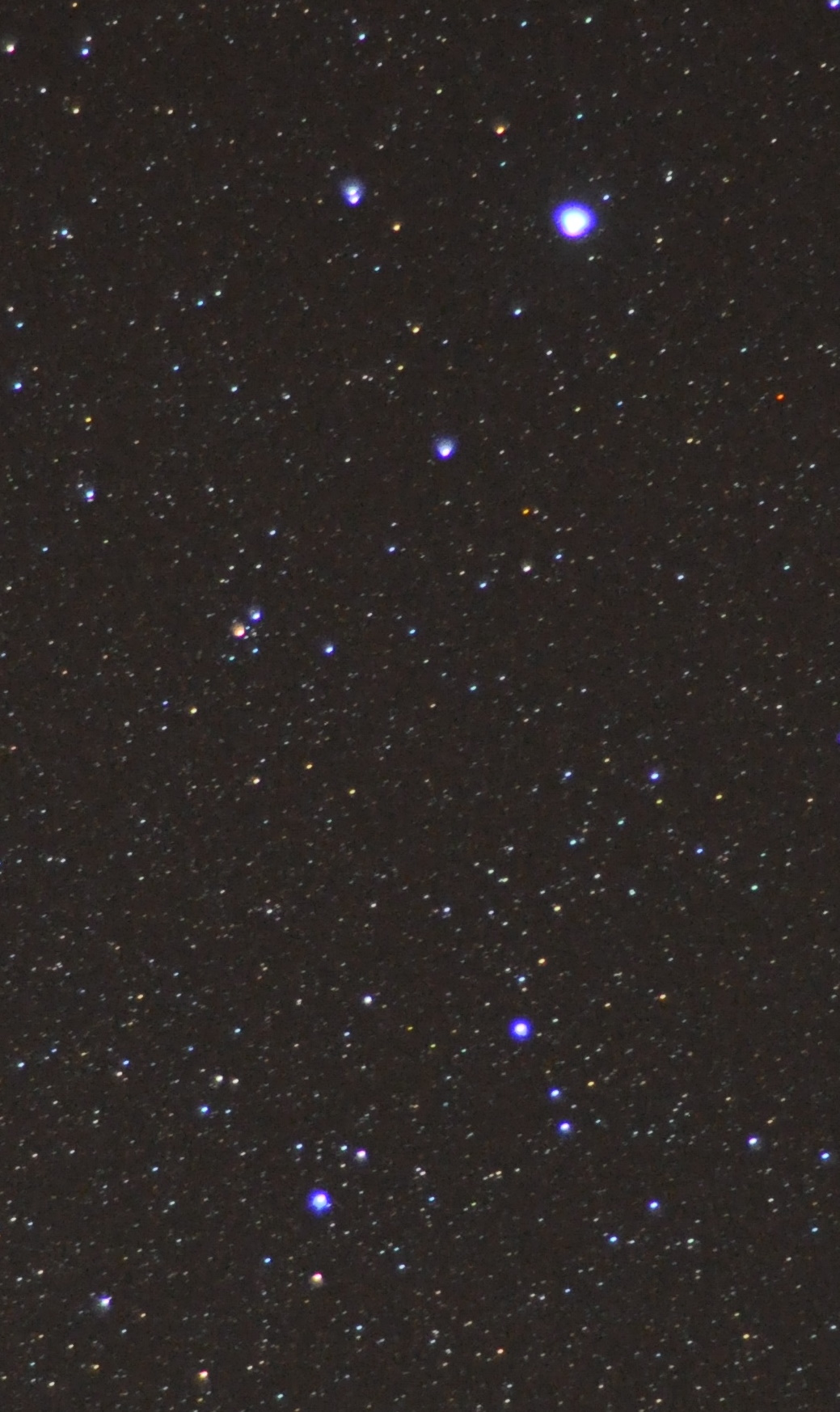
Long-exposure image of Lyra. Vega is at the top, with the naked-eye double Epsilon Lyrae to its left.

Another easy-to-spot variable is the bright R Lyrae, north of the main asterism. Also known as 13 Lyrae, it is a 4th-magnitude red giant semiregular variable that varies by several tenths of a magnitude. Its periodicity is complex, with several different periods of varying lengths, most notably one of 46 days and one of 64 days. Even further north is FL Lyrae, a much fainter 9th-magnitude Algol variable that drops by half a magnitude every 2.18 days during the primary eclipse. Both components are main-sequence stars, the primary being late F-type and the secondary late G-type. The system was one of the first main-sequence eclipsing binaries containing G-type star to have its properties known as well as the better-studied early-type eclipsing binaries.

At the very northernmost edge of the constellation is the even fainter V361 Lyrae, an eclipsing binary that does not easily fall into one of the traditional classes, with features of Beta Lyrae, W Ursae Majoris, and cataclysmic variables. It may be a representative of a very brief phase in which the system is transitioning into a contact binary. It can be found less than a degree away from the naked-eye star 16 Lyrae, a 5th-magnitude A-type subgiant located around 37 parsecs distant.

The brightest star not included in the asterism and the westernmost cataloged by Bayer or Flamsteed is Kappa Lyrae, a typical red giant around 73 parsecs distant. Similar bright orange or red giants include the 4th-magnitude Theta Lyrae, Lambda Lyrae, and HD 173780. Lambda is located just south of Gamma, Theta is positioned in the east, and HD 173780, the brightest star in the constellation with no Bayer or Flamsteed designation, is more southernly. Just north of Theta and of almost exactly the same magnitude is Eta Lyrae, a blue subgiant with a near-solar metal abundance. Also nearby is the faint HP Lyrae, a post-asymptotic giant branch (AGB) star that shows variability. The reason for its variability is still a mystery: first cataloged as an eclipsing binary, it was theorized to be an RV Tauri variable in 2002, but if so, it would be by far the hottest such variable discovered.

In the extreme east is RR Lyrae, the prototype of the large class of variables known as RR Lyrae variables, which are pulsating variables similar to Cepheids, but are evolved population II stars of spectral types A and F. Such stars are usually not found in a galaxy's thin disk, but rather in the galactic halo. Such stars serve as standard candles, and thus are a reliable way to calculate distances to the globular clusters in which they reside. RR Lyrae itself varies between magnitudes 7 and 8 while exhibiting the Blazhko effect. The easternmost star designated by Flamsteed, 19 Lyrae, is also a small-amplitude variable, an Alpha^{2} Canum Venaticorum variable with a period of just over one day.

Another evolved star is the naked-eye variable XY Lyrae, a red bright giant just north of Vega that varies between 6th and 7th magnitudes over a period of 120 days. Also just visible to the naked eye is the peculiar classical Cepheid V473 Lyrae. It is unique in that it is the only known Cepheid in the Milky Way to undergo periodic phase and amplitude changes, analogous to the Blazhko effect in RR Lyrae stars. At 1.5 days, its period was the shortest known for a classical Cepheid at the time of its discovery. W and S Lyrae are two of the many Mira variables in Lyra. W varies between 7th and 12th magnitudes over approximately 200 days, while S, slightly fainter, is a silicate carbon star, likely of the J-type. Another evolved star is EP Lyrae, a faint RV Tauri variable and an "extreme example" of a post-AGB star. It and a likely companion are surrounded by a circumstellar disk of material.

Rather close to Earth at a distance of only 16 parsecs (52 ly) is Gliese 758. The sunlike primary star has a brown dwarf companion, the coldest to have been imaged around a sunlike star in thermal light when it was discovered in 2009. Only slightly farther away is V478 Lyrae, an eclipsing RS Canum Venaticorum variable whose primary star shows active starspot activity.

One of the most peculiar systems in Lyra is MV Lyrae, a nova-like star consisting of a red dwarf and a white dwarf. Originally classified as a VY Sculptoris star due to spending most time at maximum brightness, since around 1979 the system has been dominantly at minimum brightness, with periodic outbursts. Its nature is still not fully understood. Another outbursting star is AY Lyrae, an SU Ursae Majoris-type dwarf nova that has undergone several superoutbursts. Of the same type is V344 Lyrae, notable for an extremely short period between superoutbursts coupled with one of the highest amplitudes for such a period. The true nova HR Lyrae flared in 1919 to a maximum magnitude of 6.5, over 9.5 magnitudes higher than in quiescence. Some of its characteristics are similar to those of recurring novae.

=== Deep-sky objects ===
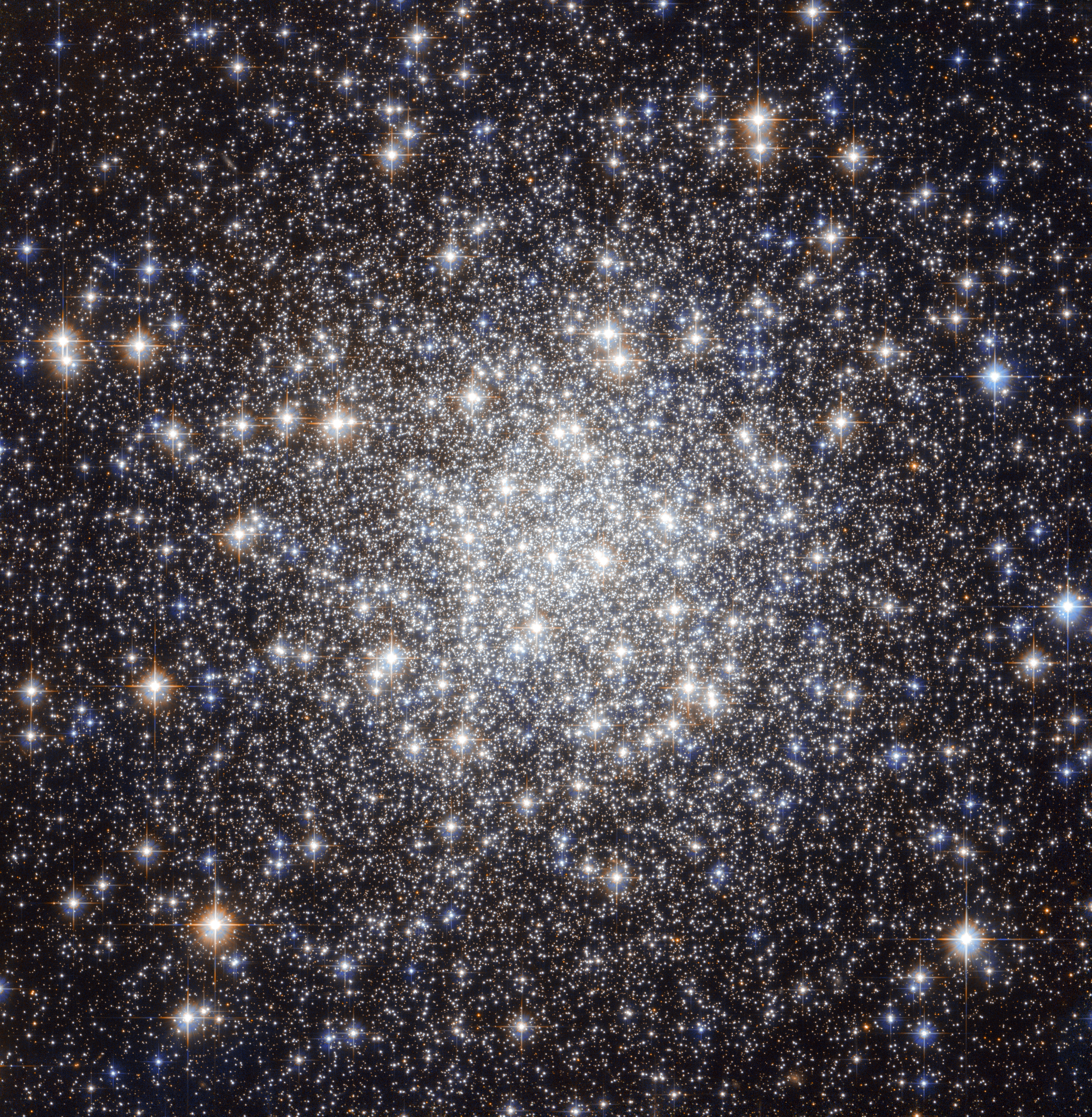
Messier 56 is composed of a large number of stars, tightly bound to each other by gravity. In Lyra are the objects M56, M57, and Kuiper 90. M56 is a rather loose globular cluster at a distance of approximately 32,900 light-years, with a diameter of about 85 light-years. Its apparent brightness is 8.3m.

M57, also known as the "Ring Nebula" and NGC 6720, at a distance of 2,550 light-years from Earth is one of the best known planetary nebulae and the second to be discovered; its integrated magnitude is 8.8. It was discovered in 1779 by Antoine Darquier, 15 years after Charles Messier discovered the Dumbbell Nebula. Astronomers have determined that it is between 6,000 and 8,000 years old; it is approximately one light-year in diameter. The outer part of the nebula appears red in photographs because of emission from ionized hydrogen. The middle region is colored green; doubly ionized oxygen emits greenish-blue light. The hottest region, closest to the central star, appears blue because of emission from helium. The central star itself is a white dwarf with a temperature of 120,000 kelvins. In telescopes, the nebula appears as a visible ring with a green tinge; it is slightly elliptical because its three-dimensional shape is a torus or cylinder seen from a slight angle. It can be found halfway between Gamma Lyrae and Beta Lyrae.

Another planetary nebula in Lyra is Abell 46. The central star, V477 Lyrae, is an eclipsing post-common-envelope binary, consisting of a white dwarf primary and an oversized secondary component due to recent accretion. The nebula itself is of relatively low surface brightness compared to the central star, and is undersized for the primary's mass for reasons not yet fully understood.

NGC 6791 is a cluster of stars in Lyra. It contains three age groups of stars: 4 billion year-old white dwarfs, 6 billion year-old white dwarfs and 8 billion year-old normal stars.

NGC 6745 is an irregular spiral galaxy in Lyra that is at a distance of 208 million light-years. Several million years ago, it collided with a smaller galaxy, which created a region filled with young, hot, blue stars. Astronomers do not know if the collision was simply a glancing blow or a prelude to a full-on merger, which would end with the two galaxies incorporated into one larger, probably elliptical galaxy.

A remarkable long-duration gamma-ray burst was GRB 050525A, which flared in 2005. The afterglow re-brightened at 33 minutes after the original burst, only the third found to exhibit such an effect in the timeframe, and unable to be completely explained by known phenomena. The light curve observed over the next 100 days was consistent with that of a supernova or even a hypernova, dubbed SN 2005nc. The host galaxy proved elusive to find at first, although it was subsequently identified.

=== Exoplanets ===
In orbit around the orange subgiant star HD 177830 is one of the earliest exoplanets to be detected. A jovian-mass planet, it orbits in an eccentric orbit with a period of 390 days. A second planet closer to the star was discovered in 2011. Visible to the naked eye are HD 173416, a yellow giant hosting a planet over twice the mass of Jupiter discovered in 2009; and HD 176051, a low-mass binary star containing another high-mass planet. Just short of naked-eye visibility is HD 178911, a triple system consisting of a close binary and a visually separable sunlike star. The sunlike star has a planet with over 6 Jupiter masses discovered in 2001, the second found in a triple system after that of 16 Cygni.

One of the most-studied exoplanets in the night sky is TrES-1b, in orbit around the star GSC 02652-01324. Detected from a transit of its parent star, the planet has around 3/4 the mass of Jupiter, yet orbits its parent star in only three days. The transits have been reported to have anomalies multiple times. Originally thought to be possibly due to the presence of an Earth-like planet, it is now accepted that the irregularities are due to a large starspot. Also discovered by the transit method is WASP-3b, with 1.75 times the mass of Jupiter. At the time of its discovery, it was one of the hottest known exoplanets, in orbit around the F-type main-sequence star WASP-3. Similar to TrES-1b, irregularities in the transits had left open the possibility of a second planet, although this now appears unlikely as well.

Lyra is one of three constellations (along with neighboring Cygnus and Draco) to be in the Kepler Mission's field of view, and as such it contains many more known exoplanets than most constellations. One of the first discovered by the mission is Kepler-7b, an extremely low-density exoplanet with less than half the mass of Jupiter, yet nearly 1.5 times the radius. Almost as sparse is Kepler-8b, only slightly more massive and of a similar radius. The Kepler-20 system contains five known planets; three of them are only slightly smaller than Neptune, while the other two are some of the first Earth-sized exoplanets to be discovered. Kepler-37 is another star with an exoplanet discovered by Kepler; the planet is the smallest known extrasolar planet known as of February 2013.

In April 2013, it was announced that of the five planets orbiting Kepler-62, at least two—Kepler-62e and Kepler-62f—are within the boundaries of the habitable zone of that star, where scientists think liquid water could exist, and are both candidates for being a solid, rocky, earth-like planet. The exoplanets are 1.6 and 1.4 times the diameter of Earth respectively, with their star Kepler-62 at a distance of 1,200 light-years.

== See also ==
- Lyra (Chinese astronomy)
- Uttara Ashadha
- Aniara
