= List of stars in Cygnus =

This is the list of notable stars in the constellation of Cygnus, sorted by decreasing apparent magnitude.

Name	B	F	Var	HD	HIP	RA	Dec	vis. mag.	abs. mag.	Dist. (ly)	Sp. class	Notes
Deneb	α	50		197345	102098	20^{h} 41^{m} 25.91^{s}	+45° 16′ 49.2″	1.25	−8.38	2615±215	A2Ia	prototype of α Cyg variables
γ Cyg	γ	37		194093	100453	20^{h} 22^{m} 13.70^{s}	+40° 15′ 24.1″	2.23	−6.12	1523	F8Ib	Sadr, suspected variable
ε Cyg	ε	53		197989	102488	20^{h} 46^{m} 12.43^{s}	+33° 58′ 10.0″	2.48	0.76	72	K0III	Aljanah
δ Cyg	δ	18		186882	97165	19^{h} 44^{m} 58.44^{s}	+45° 07′ 50.5″	2.86	−0.74	171	B9.5III	Fawaris, triple star
Albireo A	β^{1}	6		183912	95947	19^{h} 30^{m} 43.29^{s}	+27° 57′ 34.9″	3.05	−2.31	385	K3II+...	prominent visual binary with Albireo B; spectroscopic binary
ζ Cyg	ζ	64		202109	104732	21^{h} 12^{m} 56.18^{s}	+30° 13′ 37.5″	3.21	−0.12	151	G8II SB	Tianjinnan, multiple star
ξ Cyg	ξ	62		200905	104060	21^{h} 04^{m} 55.86^{s}	+43° 55′ 40.3″	3.72	−4.07	1177	K5Ibv SB	
τ Cyg	τ	65		202444	104887	21^{h} 14^{m} 47.35^{s}	+38° 02′ 39.6″	3.74	2.14	68	F1IV	Enduri Senggu, multiple star; δ Sct variable
ι Cyg	ι	10		184006	95853	19^{h} 29^{m} 42.34^{s}	+51° 43′ 46.1″	3.76	0.89	122	A5Vn	
κ Cyg	κ	1		181276	94779	19^{h} 17^{m} 06.11^{s}	+53° 22′ 05.4″	3.80	0.91	123	K0III	variable
ο^{1} Cyg	ο^{1}	31	V695	192577	99675	20^{h} 13^{m} 37.90^{s}	+46° 44′ 28.8″	3.80	−4.29	1353	K2II+...	Algol variable
η Cyg	η	21		188947	98110	19^{h} 56^{m} 18.40^{s}	+35° 05′ 00.6″	3.89	0.74	139	K0IIIvar	Almighzalmultiple star
ν Cyg	ν	58		199629	103413	20^{h} 57^{m} 10.41^{s}	+41° 10′ 01.9″	3.94	−1.25	356	A1Vn	
ο^{2} Cyg	ο^{2}	32	V1488	192909	99848	20^{h} 15^{m} 28.32^{s}	+47° 42′ 51.1″	3.96	−3.70	1109	K3Ib-II comp	Algol variable
ρ Cyg	ρ	73		205435	106481	21^{h} 33^{m} 58.87^{s}	+45° 35′ 31.4″	3.98	1.07	124	G8III	variable
41 Cyg		41		195295	101076	20^{h} 29^{m} 23.73^{s}	+30° 22′ 06.8″	4.01	−2.82	758	F5II	variable
52 Cyg		52		197912	102453	20^{h} 45^{m} 39.76^{s}	+30° 43′ 10.8″	4.22	0.22	206	K0III	double star
σ Cyg	σ	67		202850	105102	21^{h} 17^{m} 24.95^{s}	+39° 23′ 40.9″	4.22	−6.49	4528	B9Iab	
π^{2} Cyg	π^{2}	81		207330	107533	21^{h} 46^{m} 47.61^{s}	+49° 18′ 34.5″	4.23	−3.52	1156	B3III	spectroscopic binary
33 Cyg		33		192696	99655	20^{h} 13^{m} 23.80^{s}	+56° 34′ 03.1″	4.28	0.93	152	A3IV-Vn	variable
υ Cyg	υ	66		202904	105138	21^{h} 17^{m} 55.07^{s}	+34° 53′ 48.8″	4.41	−2.80	901	B2Vne	emission-line star; γ Cas variable
39 Cyg		39		194317	100587	20^{h} 23^{m} 51.60^{s}	+32° 11′ 24.7″	4.43	−0.04	255	K3III	
θ Cyg	θ	13		185395	96441	19^{h} 36^{m} 26.54^{s}	+50° 13′ 13.7″	4.49	3.14	61	F4V	triple star
λ Cyg	λ	54		198183	102589	20^{h} 47^{m} 24.53^{s}	+36° 29′ 26.7″	4.53	−2.62	879	B6IV	Be star
63 Cyg	f^{2}	63		201251	104194	21^{h} 06^{m} 36.09^{s}	+47° 38′ 54.3″	4.56	−2.83	982	K4II	double star
47 Cyg A		47	V2125	196093	101474	20^{h} 33^{m} 54.19^{s}	+35° 15′ 03.1″	4.61	−2.66	929	K2Ib comp	double star; pulsating variable
φ Cyg	φ	12		185734	96683	19^{h} 39^{m} 22.60^{s}	+30° 09′ 11.6″	4.68	0.25	251	G8III-IV...	spectroscopic binary
π^{1} Cyg	π^{1}	80		206672	107136	21^{h} 42^{m} 05.66^{s}	+51° 11′ 22.7″	4.69	−3.87	1680	B3IV	Azelfafage; spectroscopic binary
μ^{1} Cyg	μ^{1}	78		206826	107310	21^{h} 44^{m} 08.59^{s}	+28° 44′ 33.4″	4.69	2.94	73	F6V	multiple star
8 Cyg		8		184171	96052	19^{h} 31^{m} 46.32^{s}	+34° 27′ 10.7″	4.74	−1.68	627	B3IV	
59 Cyg	f^{1}	59	V832	200120	103632	20^{h} 59^{m} 49.55^{s}	+47° 31′ 15.4″	4.74	−2.95	1124	B1ne	irregular variable
P Cyg	P	34		193237	100044	20^{h} 17^{m} 47.20^{s}	+38° 01′ 58.6″	4.77	−6.65	6269	B2pe	Nova Cygni 1600; hypergiant; prototype of P Cyg variables
30 Cyg		30		192514	99639	20^{h} 13^{m} 18.04^{s}	+46° 48′ 56.4″	4.80	−1.91	716	A5IIIn	variable
57 Cyg		57		199081	103089	20^{h} 53^{m} 14.75^{s}	+44° 23′ 14.2″	4.80	−1.13	501	B5V	spectroscopic binary
55 Cyg		55	V1661	198478	102724	20^{h} 48^{m} 56.29^{s}	+46° 06′ 50.9″	4.81	−4.38	2248	B3Ia	α Cyg variable; emission-line star
72 Cyg		72		205512	106551	21^{h} 34^{m} 46.48^{s}	+38° 32′ 01.8″	4.87	0.40	255	K1III	
15 Cyg		15		186675	97118	19^{h} 44^{m} 16.55^{s}	+37° 21′ 15.4″	4.89	0.23	279	G8III	
ψ Cyg	ψ	24		189037	98055	19^{h} 55^{m} 37.82^{s}	+52° 26′ 20.5″	4.91	0.18	288	A4Vn	multiple star
28 Cyg	b^{2}	28	V1624	191610	99303	20^{h} 09^{m} 25.62^{s}	+36° 50′ 22.5″	4.93	−2.18	860	B2.5V	Be star; emission-line star
29 Cyg	b^{3}	29	V1644	192640	99770	20^{h} 14^{m} 31.98^{s}	+36° 48′ 22.1″	4.93	1.86	134	A2V	variable
T Cyg			T	198134	102571	20^{h} 47^{m} 10.72^{s}	+34° 22′ 26.8″	4.93	−0.51	399	K3IIIvar	triple star; variable
ω^{1} Cyg	ω^{1}	45	V2014	195556	101138	20^{h} 30^{m} 03.53^{s}	+48° 57′ 05.6″	4.94	−2.19	869	B2.5IV	β Cep variable
22 Cyg		22		188892	98068	19^{h} 55^{m} 51.76^{s}	+38° 29′ 12.1″	4.95	−2.89	1203	B5IV	
HD 189276				189276	98073	19^{h} 55^{m} 55.39^{s}	+58° 50′ 45.7″	4.98	−2.27	918	K5II-III	
2 Cyg		2		182568	95372	19^{h} 24^{m} 07.57^{s}	+29° 37′ 16.7″	4.99	−1.89	774	B3IV	double star
17 Cyg		17		187013	97295	19^{h} 46^{m} 25.58^{s}	+33° 43′ 43.3″	5.00	3.40	68	F5	
20 Cyg	d	20		188056	97635	19^{h} 50^{m} 37.73^{s}	+52° 59′ 17.4″	5.03	1.18	192	K3IIIvar	variable
68 Cyg	A	68	V1809	203064	105186	21^{h} 18^{m} 27.18^{s}	+43° 56′ 45.5″	5.04		4600	O8e	rotating ellipsoidal variable
74 Cyg		74		205835	106711	21^{h} 36^{m} 56.98^{s}	+40° 24′ 48.6″	5.04	1.03	206	A5V	
				186155	96825	19^{h} 40^{m} 50.11^{s}	+45° 31′ 28.7″	5.06	1.62	159	F5II	variable
26 Cyg	e	26		190147	98571	20^{h} 01^{m} 21.55^{s}	+50° 06′ 16.8″	5.06	−0.54	429	K1II-III	multiple star
56 Cyg		56		198639	102843	20^{h} 50^{m} 04.83^{s}	+44° 03′ 32.3″	5.06	1.93	138	A4me...	double star
75 Cyg		75		206330	106999	21^{h} 40^{m} 11.06^{s}	+43° 16′ 25.7″	5.09	−0.38	404	M1IIIvar	triple star; variable
Albireo B	β^{2}	6		183914	95951	19^{h} 30^{m} 45.40^{s}	+27° 57′ 55.0″	5.12	−0.19	376	B8V	component of the Albireo system; emission-line star
23 Cyg		23		188665	97870	19^{h} 53^{m} 17.37^{s}	+57° 31′ 24.5″	5.14	−1.32	638	B5V	
35 Cyg		35		193370	100122	20^{h} 18^{m} 39.07^{s}	+34° 58′ 58.0″	5.14	−3.80	2000	F5Ib	spectroscopic binary
25 Cyg		25	V1746	189687	98425	19^{h} 59^{m} 55.20^{s}	+37° 02′ 34.4″	5.15	−3.27	1575	B3IV	γ Cas variable & β Cep variable; emission-line star
4 Cyg		4	V1741	183056	95556	19^{h} 26^{m} 09.12^{s}	+36° 19′ 04.3″	5.17	−1.34	653	B9sp...	spectroscopic binary
				185351	96459	19^{h} 36^{m} 38.05^{s}	+44° 41′ 42.7″	5.17	2.13	132	K0III	
19 Cyg		19	V1509	187849	97630	19^{h} 50^{m} 33.99^{s}	+38° 43′ 19.8″	5.18	−1.29	642	M2IIIa	variable
61 Cyg A		61	V1803	201091	104214	21^{h} 06^{m} 50.84^{s}	+38° 44′ 29.4″	5.20	7.49	11	K5V	Bessel's Star; BY Draconis variable; 14th nearest star system
71 Cyg	g	71		204771	106093	21^{h} 29^{m} 26.91^{s}	+46° 32′ 25.2″	5.22	1.04	224	K0III	
				193092	99968	20^{h} 16^{m} 55.28^{s}	+40° 21′ 54.3″	5.27	−2.16	1000	K5II	variable
				204411	105898	21^{h} 26^{m} 51.57^{s}	+48° 50′ 06.4″	5.29	−0.10	389	A6pe...	α^{2}CVn variable
70 Cyg		70		204403	105942	21^{h} 27^{m} 21.36^{s}	+37° 07′ 00.5″	5.30	−3.38	1772	B3V	
				184875	96288	19^{h} 34^{m} 41.26^{s}	+42° 24′ 45.3″	5.34	−0.64	512	A2V	
27 Cyg	b^{1}	27	V2008	191026	99031	20^{h} 06^{m} 21.93^{s}	+35° 58′ 24.7″	5.38	3.46	79	K0IV	RS CVn variable
60 Cyg		60	V1931	200310	103732	21^{h} 01^{m} 10.92^{s}	+46° 09′ 20.8″	5.38	−2.73	1364	B1V	eclipsing binary
9 Cyg		9		184759	96302	19^{h} 34^{m} 50.92^{s}	+29° 27′ 46.5″	5.39	−0.70	538	A0V+...	spectroscopic binary
14 Cyg		14		185872	96693	19^{h} 39^{m} 26.47^{s}	+42° 49′ 05.6″	5.41	−1.20	685	B9III	
51 Cyg		51		197511	102177	20^{h} 42^{m} 12.63^{s}	+50° 20′ 24.1″	5.41	−1.85	924	B2V	multiple star
				189178	98194	19^{h} 57^{m} 13.86^{s}	+40° 22′ 04.2″	5.46	−2.90	1531	B5V	double star
				199101	103145	20^{h} 53^{m} 53.91^{s}	+33° 26′ 16.1″	5.47	−0.89	609	K5III	
				199098	103094	20^{h} 53^{m} 18.56^{s}	+45° 10′ 54.1″	5.48	−1.31	744	K0II	
				189395	98325	19^{h} 58^{m} 37.96^{s}	+30° 59′ 01.2″	5.51	−0.60	544	B9Vn	
49 Cyg		49		197178	102066	20^{h} 41^{m} 02.60^{s}	+32° 18′ 28.0″	5.51	−1.45	805	G8IIb	
				206749	107235	21^{h} 43^{m} 06.48^{s}	+41° 09′ 18.0″	5.51	−0.77	587	M2III	
ω^{2} Cyg	ω^{2}	46		195774	101243	20^{h} 31^{m} 18.81663^{s}	+49° 13′ 13.0656″	5.53	−0.03	399	M2III	Ruchba; suspected member of Hercules stream
49 Cyg		49		197177	102066	20^{h} 41^{m} 02.54^{s}	+32° 18′ 26.3″	5.53	−1.43	805	G8IIb	
				184293	96014	19^{h} 31^{m} 19.36^{s}	+50° 18′ 23.7″	5.55	−0.22	465	K1III	
				199870	103519	20^{h} 58^{m} 19.38^{s}	+44° 28′ 17.5″	5.55	1.00	265	G8III	
V1942 Cyg			V1942	209515	108845	22^{h} 02^{m} 56.68^{s}	+44° 38′ 59.8″	5.57	−0.48	529	A0IV	α^{2} CVn variable
36 Cyg		36		193369	100108	20^{h} 18^{m} 28.63^{s}	+36° 59′ 59.1″	5.58	1.70	195	A2V	
				194152	100437	20^{h} 22^{m} 05.35^{s}	+45° 47′ 41.6″	5.58	0.06	415	K0IIIvar	
				199955	103530	20^{h} 58^{m} 30.03^{s}	+50° 27′ 42.4″	5.59	−2.35	1264	B5Vn	
				204153	105769	21^{h} 25^{m} 19.39^{s}	+46° 42′ 51.2″	5.59	2.91	112	F0V	
				188209	97757	19^{h} 51^{m} 59.07^{s}	+47° 01′ 38.5″	5.60	−7.69	14818	O9.5Ia	
				198345	102635	20^{h} 47^{m} 49.29^{s}	+47° 49′ 54.9″	5.60	−0.49	538	K5III	
V389 Cyg			V389	201433	104371	21^{h} 08^{m} 38.87^{s}	+30° 12′ 20.5″	5.60	−0.07	444	B9V	multiple; variable
V1768 Cyg			V1768	190603	98863	20^{h} 04^{m} 36.18^{s}	+32° 13′ 07.0″	5.62	−7.48	13583	B1.5Ia comp	α Cyg variable
40 Cyg		40		195050	100907	20^{h} 27^{m} 34.27^{s}	+38° 26′ 25.9″	5.63	1.04	270	A3V	
V380 Cyg			V380	187879	97634	19^{h} 50^{m} 37.33^{s}	+40° 35′ 59.2″	5.68	−3.80	2567	B1III	Algol variable
				196852	101899	20^{h} 38^{m} 59.54^{s}	+30° 20′ 03.9″	5.68	0.31	386	K2III	
				197392	102155	20^{h} 41^{m} 56.50^{s}	+41° 43′ 00.7″	5.68	−1.84	1042	B8II-III	
V2140 Cyg			V2140	199478	103312	20^{h} 55^{m} 49.81^{s}	+47° 25′ 03.6″	5.68	−6.60	9314	B8Ia	α Cyg variable
				203644	105497	21^{h} 22^{m} 00.38^{s}	+49° 23′ 19.3″	5.68	0.66	328	K0III	
79 Cyg		79		206774	107253	21^{h} 43^{m} 25.63^{s}	+38° 17′ 01.0″	5.69	1.08	272	A0V	
				192787	99841	20^{h} 15^{m} 23.79^{s}	+33° 43′ 45.7″	5.70	0.88	300	K0III	
				184960	96258	19^{h} 34^{m} 19.76^{s}	+51° 14′ 13.5″	5.71	3.67	83	F7V	
7 Cyg		7		183534	95656	19^{h} 27^{m} 25.97^{s}	+52° 19′ 13.8″	5.73	0.51	361	A1V	
Gl 777				190360	98767	20^{h} 03^{m} 36.95^{s}	+29° 53′ 53.1″	5.73	4.72	52	G6IV+...	binary star; has two planets (b & c)
43 Cyg		43	V2121	195068	100859	20^{h} 27^{m} 02.21^{s}	+49° 22′ 59.6″	5.73	2.85	123	F0V:	V2121 Cyg; γ Dor variable
77 Cyg		77		206644	107162	21^{h} 42^{m} 22.94^{s}	+41° 04′ 37.3″	5.73	0.44	372	A0V	
				201834	104516	21^{h} 10^{m} 15.55^{s}	+53° 33′ 47.2″	5.75	0.15	431	B9III	
				203245	105282	21^{h} 19^{m} 28.74^{s}	+49° 30′ 37.0″	5.75	−0.33	536	B6V	
				204485	106003	21^{h} 28^{m} 08.16^{s}	+32° 13′ 30.5″	5.75	2.50	145	F0V	
				193592	100097	20^{h} 18^{m} 24.76^{s}	+55° 23′ 49.8″	5.76	1.01	291	A2Vs	
DT Cyg			DT	201078	104185	21^{h} 06^{m} 30.24^{s}	+31° 11′ 04.8″	5.77	−3.05	1895	F7.5Ib-IIv	Cepheid variable
				205314	106393	21^{h} 32^{m} 56.58^{s}	+49° 58′ 39.4″	5.77	−0.05	475	A0V	
V2015 Cyg			V2015	196178	101475	20^{h} 33^{m} 54.84^{s}	+46° 41′ 37.9″	5.78	−0.06	481	B9sp...	α^{2} CVn variable
				188650	97985	19^{h} 54^{m} 48.24^{s}	+36° 59′ 44.4″	5.79	−2.58	1538	Fp	
				209419	108758	22^{h} 01^{m} 50.58^{s}	+52° 52′ 56.1″	5.79	−1.77	1058	B5III	
				191195	99026	20^{h} 06^{m} 13.64^{s}	+53° 09′ 54.2″	5.81	3.00	119	F5V	
				187235	97376	19^{h} 47^{m} 27.78^{s}	+38° 24′ 27.4″	5.83	−0.05	489	B8Vn	
				193322	100069	20^{h} 18^{m} 06.99^{s}	+40° 43′ 55.6″	5.83	−2.56	1552	O9V	
				199611	103359	20^{h} 56^{m} 25.44^{s}	+50° 43′ 43.1″	5.83	2.20	174	F0III	
				186619	97081	19^{h} 43^{m} 45.08^{s}	+41° 46′ 23.1″	5.86	−0.57	631	M0III	
				192985	99889	20^{h} 16^{m} 00.61^{s}	+45° 34′ 46.8″	5.87	3.18	113	F5V:	
V2119 Cyg			V2119	194335	100574	20^{h} 23^{m} 44.37^{s}	+37° 28′ 35.2″	5.87	−1.32	893	B2Vne	Be star
				179094	94013	19^{h} 08^{m} 25.88^{s}	+52° 25′ 33.1″	5.88	1.65	229	K1IV	RS CVn variable
V1143 Cyg			V1143	185912	96620	19^{h} 38^{m} 41.15^{s}	+54° 58′ 24.2″	5.89	2.89	130	F6Vasv	Algol variable
				195554	101084	20^{h} 29^{m} 27.11^{s}	+56° 04′ 05.4″	5.89	−1.30	896	B9Vn	
V1334 Cyg			V1334	203156	105269	21^{h} 19^{m} 22.18^{s}	+38° 14′ 14.9″	5.89	−4.27	3505	F2Ib	δ Cep variable
42 Cyg		42		195324	101067	20^{h} 29^{m} 20.39^{s}	+36° 27′ 17.0″	5.90	−2.67	1689	A1Ib	
				188252	97774	19^{h} 52^{m} 07.17^{s}	+47° 55′ 54.5″	5.91	−3.49	2470	B2III	
				189684	98383	19^{h} 59^{m} 20.42^{s}	+45° 46′ 21.3″	5.92	0.12	472	A5III	
				199612	103360	20^{h} 56^{m} 25.89^{s}	+49° 11′ 45.0″	5.92	−2.04	1273	G8II-III	
				186377	96977	19^{h} 42^{m} 44.60^{s}	+32° 25′ 36.3″	5.93	−3.26	2248	A5III	
				200817	103956	21^{h} 03^{m} 47.58^{s}	+53° 17′ 09.0″	5.93	0.46	405	K0III	
69 Cyg		69	V2157	204172	105811	21^{h} 25^{m} 47.02^{s}	+36° 40′ 02.7″	5.93	−3.71	2763	B0Ib	probable α Cyg variable
				194193	100501	20^{h} 22^{m} 45.29^{s}	+41° 01′ 34.1″	5.95	−1.15	856	M0III	
				199579	103371	20^{h} 56^{m} 34.78^{s}	+44° 55′ 29.0″	5.96	−4.44	3928	O6...	
W Cyg			W	205730	106642	21^{h} 36^{m} 02.44^{s}	+45° 22′ 28.5″	5.96	−0.43	617	M4IIIe-M6e	semiregular variable
				197139	101986	20^{h} 40^{m} 03.22^{s}	+43° 27′ 32.5″	5.97	0.17	470	K2III	
V460 Cyg			V460	206570	107129	21^{h} 42^{m} 01.08^{s}	+35° 30′ 36.7″	5.98	−2.96	2000	C6.3	DS Peg, carbon star; variable
16 Cyg A	c	16		186408	96895	19^{h} 41^{m} 49.09^{s}	+50° 31′ 31.6″	5.99	4.32	70	G2V	triple star system
V1743 Cyg			V1743	184786	96198	19^{h} 33^{m} 41.60^{s}	+49° 15′ 44.4″	6.00	−2.26	1462	M4.5III	
				192439	99579	20^{h} 12^{m} 31.73^{s}	+51° 27′ 49.0″	6.01	0.50	412	K1III:	
				200253	103734	21^{h} 01^{m} 12.87^{s}	+36° 01′ 33.7″	6.01	−0.51	657	G5III	
				204428	105891	21^{h} 26^{m} 44.95^{s}	+52° 53′ 54.7″	6.01	0.35	442	B6V	
				181096	94755	19^{h} 16^{m} 51.39^{s}	+46° 59′ 54.2″	6.02	2.88	138	F6IV:	
				197120	102033	20^{h} 40^{m} 36.26^{s}	+29° 48′ 19.6″	6.02	1.45	267	A2V	
				204965	106171	21^{h} 30^{m} 20.31^{s}	+52° 57′ 28.6″	6.02	0.18	479	A3V	
11 Cyg		11		185037	96387	19^{h} 35^{m} 48.30^{s}	+36° 56′ 40.4″	6.03	−0.74	738	B8Vn	
				189066	98143	19^{h} 56^{m} 44.14^{s}	+36° 15′ 02.2″	6.03	−1.64	1113	B5IV	
				186568	97087	19^{h} 43^{m} 51.45^{s}	+34° 09′ 45.8″	6.04	−1.17	901	B8III	
61 Cyg B		61		201092	104217	21^{h} 06^{m} 52.19^{s}	+38° 44′ 03.9″	6.05	8.33	11	K7V	component of the 61 Cyg system
				203439	105432	21^{h} 21^{m} 21.93^{s}	+32° 36′ 46.0″	6.05	−0.29	605	A1V	
				188793	97892	19^{h} 53^{m} 35.38^{s}	+59° 42′ 30.7″	6.06	0.97	339	A3V	
V2130 Cyg			V2130	197018	101949	20^{h} 39^{m} 33.31^{s}	+40° 34′ 46.8″	6.07	−1.13	898	B6IIIp Mn	SX Ari variable
				202240	104765	21^{h} 13^{m} 26.43^{s}	+36° 37′ 59.7″	6.07	−2.62	1781	F0III	
				203630	105558	21^{h} 22^{m} 42.03^{s}	+30° 18′ 35.5″	6.07	0.77	374	K1III	
76 Cyg		76		206538	107097	21^{h} 41^{m} 34.27^{s}	+40° 48′ 19.2″	6.07	0.34	455	A2V	
				186440	97028	19^{h} 43^{m} 09.60^{s}	+30° 40′ 40.4″	6.08	1.01	337	A1V	
				194097	100486	20^{h} 22^{m} 37.31^{s}	+31° 15′ 54.1″	6.09	−0.26	607	K2	
				185837	96724	19^{h} 39^{m} 44.92^{s}	+33° 58′ 44.1″	6.10	0.29	474	A3IV	
				189127	98044	19^{h} 55^{m} 22.04^{s}	+58° 15′ 01.4″	6.10	0.34	462	G9III	
				200577	103894	21^{h} 03^{m} 04.83^{s}	+38° 39′ 26.7″	6.10	−0.41	655	G8III	
				206731	107186	21^{h} 42^{m} 38.81^{s}	+49° 36′ 01.0″	6.10	−1.03	869	G8II	
				207516	107664	21^{h} 48^{m} 29.34^{s}	+38° 38′ 54.9″	6.10	0.20	493	B8V	
V1339 Cyg			V1339	206632	107140	21^{h} 42^{m} 08.35^{s}	+45° 45′ 56.7″	6.11	−0.47	676	M4.5	
				187638	97538	19^{h} 49^{m} 27.50^{s}	+38° 42′ 36.6″	6.12	−0.53	697	G6III	
				191243	99145	20^{h} 07^{m} 41.44^{s}	+34° 25′ 22.5″	6.12	−2.83	2012	B5Ib	
				202923	105064	21^{h} 17^{m} 02.02^{s}	+53° 59′ 51.4″	6.12	0.67	401	A1V	
μ^{2} Cyg	μ^{2}	78		206827		21^{h} 44^{m} 08.46^{s}	+28° 44′ 34.5″	6.12			G2V	
V2093 Cyg			V2093	187880	97651	19^{h} 50^{m} 46.87^{s}	+37° 49′ 34.7″	6.13	−3.96	3396	M3III	
				188149	97789	19^{h} 52^{m} 16.40^{s}	+36° 25′ 56.2″	6.13	−0.65	739	K4III	
				192535	99685	20^{h} 13^{m} 42.82^{s}	+43° 22′ 44.4″	6.13	−0.64	738	K4III	
				186927	97242	19^{h} 45^{m} 51.35^{s}	+35° 00′ 46.0″	6.14	0.57	424	A2V+...	
				187372	97372	19^{h} 47^{m} 26.85^{s}	+47° 54′ 27.6″	6.14	−1.74	1230	M2III	
V2100 Cyg			V2100	189775	98379	19^{h} 59^{m} 15.34^{s}	+52° 03′ 20.5″	6.14	−0.72	769	B5III	α^{2}CVn variable
				190964	98915	20^{h} 05^{m} 06.72^{s}	+51° 50′ 21.6″	6.14	−0.64	741	M1IIIa	
				195964	101285	20^{h} 31^{m} 46.52^{s}	+56° 46′ 47.5″	6.14	−0.87	821	K5III	
				203096	105229	21^{h} 18^{m} 55.33^{s}	+41° 02′ 25.9″	6.15	−2.43	1698	A5IV	
				189296	98111	19^{h} 56^{m} 19.02^{s}	+56° 41′ 13.1″	6.16	1.50	279	A4Vn	
				190781	98858	20^{h} 04^{m} 28.79^{s}	+48° 13′ 46.8″	6.16	−0.09	579	A2IV	
				206040	106771	21^{h} 37^{m} 38.81^{s}	+54° 02′ 31.9″	6.16	−0.33	647	K1III	
				206509	107041	21^{h} 40^{m} 43.30^{s}	+54° 52′ 19.7″	6.16	−0.51	703	K0III	
				186121	96805	19^{h} 40^{m} 41.15^{s}	+43° 04′ 40.2″	6.17	−1.99	1399	M2III	
				199892	103532	20^{h} 58^{m} 30.94^{s}	+41° 56′ 23.7″	6.17	0.40	465	B7III	
				202862	105101	21^{h} 17^{m} 23.18^{s}	+42° 41′ 00.8″	6.17	−1.57	1152	B7Vn	
				205114	106267	21^{h} 31^{m} 27.46^{s}	+52° 37′ 11.5″	6.17	−1.56	1148	G2Ib+...	
				205551	106518	21^{h} 34^{m} 27.46^{s}	+51° 41′ 54.5″	6.17	−2.32	1630	B9III	
				187038	97307	19^{h} 46^{m} 35.04^{s}	+32° 53′ 19.0″	6.18	0.92	367	K2	
				190771	98921	20^{h} 05^{m} 09.59^{s}	+38° 28′ 41.5″	6.18	4.80	62	G5IV	
V1981 Cyg			V1981	200527	103828	21^{h} 02^{m} 24.20^{s}	+44° 47′ 27.6″	6.18	−1.71	1235	M3Ib-II:	semiregular variable
				202314	104822	21^{h} 14^{m} 10.28^{s}	+29° 54′ 03.5″	6.18	−3.18	2433	G2Ib	
				191096	98946	20^{h} 05^{m} 21.50^{s}	+56° 20′ 28.4″	6.19	2.60	170	F4V	
				196379	101556	20^{h} 34^{m} 50.41^{s}	+51° 51′ 15.2″	6.19	−5.54	7244	A9II	
CP Cyg			CP	205939	106752	21^{h} 37^{m} 27.88^{s}	+44° 41′ 47.8″	6.19	−0.35	661	A7III	variable
				194220	100515	20^{h} 22^{m} 55.49^{s}	+42° 59′ 00.4″	6.20	1.17	331	K0IIIvar	
				195820	101245	20^{h} 31^{m} 21.11^{s}	+52° 18′ 33.7″	6.20	1.06	348	K0III	
V1619 Cyg			V1619	207857	107856	21^{h} 51^{m} 04.97^{s}	+39° 32′ 11.9″	6.20	−1.39	1072	B9p HgMn	α^{2}CVn variable
44 Cyg		44		195593	101214	20^{h} 30^{m} 59.23^{s}	+36° 56′ 09.1″	6.21	−2.22	1583	F5Iab	
				196642	101756	20^{h} 37^{m} 23.57^{s}	+38° 19′ 43.6″	6.21	1.19	328	K0III	
				186307	96907	19^{h} 41^{m} 57.63^{s}	+40° 15′ 14.6″	6.22	1.62	272	A6V	
				188074	97700	19^{h} 51^{m} 19.37^{s}	+47° 22′ 37.9″	6.22	2.12	215	F2V	
				193702	100268	20^{h} 20^{m} 15.22^{s}	+39° 24′ 11.8″	6.22	1.03	355	A1V	
				181960	94974	19^{h} 19^{m} 36.42^{s}	+54° 22′ 33.8″	6.23	0.53	450	A1V	
				189942	98563	20^{h} 01^{m} 15.28^{s}	+37° 05′ 55.9″	6.23	−1.21	1003	K0III	
				193944	100295	20^{h} 20^{m} 30.64^{s}	+53° 35′ 44.5″	6.23	−2.26	1630	K5	
				202720	105034	21^{h} 16^{m} 29.62^{s}	+42° 15′ 06.6″	6.23	−0.89	865	K2	
				185955	96706	19^{h} 39^{m} 34.53^{s}	+45° 57′ 26.6″	6.25	0.79	402	K0III	
16 Cyg	c	16		186427	96901	19^{h} 41^{m} 52.10^{s}	+50° 31′ 04.5″	6.25	4.60	70	G5V	component of the 16 Cyg system; has a planet (b)
				207446	107637	21^{h} 48^{m} 08.41^{s}	+36° 34′ 49.5″	6.25	−0.41	701	K5	
				183986	95953	19^{h} 30^{m} 46.83^{s}	+36° 13′ 42.7″	6.26	−0.57	758	B9.5III	
				198513	102712	20^{h} 48^{m} 42.74^{s}	+51° 54′ 37.2″	6.26	−0.67	791	B8np	
				180756	94623	19^{h} 15^{m} 19.18^{s}	+50° 04′ 16.0″	6.27	1.16	342	G8III	
				205349	106420	21^{h} 33^{m} 17.89^{s}	+45° 51′ 14.5″	6.27	−2.05	1502	K1Ibvar	
				186815	97070	19^{h} 43^{m} 39.49^{s}	+57° 02′ 33.6″	6.28	1.83	253	K2III	
				192934	99893	20^{h} 16^{m} 03.43^{s}	+38° 53′ 53.1″	6.28	0.78	410	A1V	
				186760	97033	19^{h} 43^{m} 14.28^{s}	+58° 01′ 00.3″	6.29	3.02	147	G0V	
				198387	102642	20^{h} 47^{m} 52.89^{s}	+52° 24′ 27.3″	6.29	3.18	137	K0V:	
V819 Cyg			V819	188439	97845	19^{h} 53^{m} 01.25^{s}	+47° 48′ 27.9″	6.30	−3.53	3019	B0.5IIIn	β Cep variable
				198151	102530	20^{h} 46^{m} 38.61^{s}	+46° 31′ 54.2″	6.30	0.79	413	A3V	
				181597	94890	19^{h} 18^{m} 37.85^{s}	+49° 34′ 09.6″	6.32	0.81	413	K1III	
				193217	100016	20^{h} 17^{m} 29.05^{s}	+42° 43′ 19.4″	6.32	−2.49	1884	K4II:	
48 Cyg		48		196606	101765	20^{h} 37^{m} 31.77^{s}	+31° 34′ 21.1″	6.32	−0.58	784	B8IIIn	
				200753	103949	21^{h} 03^{m} 43.50^{s}	+46° 51′ 47.8″	6.32	1.79	263	F0IVn	
				189432	98320	19^{h} 58^{m} 34.35^{s}	+38° 06′ 20.5″	6.33	−2.33	1762	B5IV	
V2136 Cyg			V2136	198625	102827	20^{h} 49^{m} 54.64^{s}	+46° 39′ 40.8″	6.33	−0.92	918	B4V	
				198181	102499	20^{h} 46^{m} 21.28^{s}	+52° 59′ 44.0″	6.34	0.72	434	K0	
				200723	103963	21^{h} 03^{m} 52.14^{s}	+41° 37′ 41.9″	6.34	1.31	330	F3IV	
				193469	100155	20^{h} 18^{m} 57.54^{s}	+39° 00′ 15.1″	6.35	−2.98	2397	K5Ib	
V973 Cyg				186776	97151	19^{h} 44^{m} 49.09^{s}	+40° 43′ 00.7″	6.36	−0.86	906	M3III	
				192983	99870	20^{h} 15^{m} 43.24^{s}	+50° 13′ 58.3″	6.36	1.18	355	A2Vn	
				198976	103079	20^{h} 53^{m} 07.37^{s}	+29° 38′ 57.3″	6.36	0.78	427	K2	
				202710	105017	21^{h} 16^{m} 17.12^{s}	+44° 14′ 17.5″	6.36	−2.00	1531	K0III+...	
				205688	106661	21^{h} 36^{m} 14.02^{s}	+30° 03′ 19.0″	6.36	1.16	357	G8III-IV	
V1817 Cyg			V1817	184398	96003	19^{h} 31^{m} 13.56^{s}	+55° 43′ 54.8″	6.37	−1.17	1052	K2II-IIIcomp	RS CVn variable
				186506	97029	19^{h} 43^{m} 10.76^{s}	+38° 40′ 18.2″	6.37	−1.86	1442	K0	
				200740	103929	21^{h} 03^{m} 26.03^{s}	+50° 21′ 06.5″	6.37	0.99	388	K0	
				186901	97228	19^{h} 45^{m} 39.65^{s}	+36° 05′ 27.6″	6.38	−2.43	1884	B9.5V	
				194069	100434	20^{h} 22^{m} 03.06^{s}	+41° 07′ 55.7″	6.38	−2.01	1552	G5II+...	
				195066	100808	20^{h} 26^{m} 23.46^{s}	+56° 38′ 19.2″	6.38	0.26	547	B9V	
				185114	96316	19^{h} 35^{m} 01.23^{s}	+52° 30′ 07.6″	6.39	1.14	365	K0	
V2090 Cyg			V2090	186702	97142	19^{h} 44^{m} 38.17^{s}	+34° 24′ 51.0″	6.39	−0.64	830	M1III	
				190227	98701	20^{h} 02^{m} 48.81^{s}	+31° 57′ 31.7″	6.39	−1.31	1128	K1III	
				194951	100866	20^{h} 27^{m} 07.77^{s}	+34° 19′ 44.7″	6.39	−3.01	2470	F1II	
				203454	105406	21^{h} 21^{m} 01.44^{s}	+40° 20′ 44.1″	6.39	4.27	87	F8V	
				207119	107398	21^{h} 45^{m} 12.40^{s}	+52° 16′ 03.3″	6.40	−3.20	2717	K5Ib	
				198237	102585	20^{h} 47^{m} 20.77^{s}	+45° 34′ 48.0″	6.41	−1.61	1309	K3III	
V2173 Cyg			V2173	208727	108348	21^{h} 57^{m} 02.20^{s}	+48° 40′ 07.0″	6.42		985	B8V	
V1351 Cyg			V1351	186532	96919	19^{h} 42^{m} 04.13^{s}	+55° 27′ 47.9″	6.42	−0.44	767	M5IIIa	
V1765 Cyg			V1765	187459	97485	19^{h} 48^{m} 50.60^{s}	+33° 26′ 14.3″	6.42	−2.74	2218	B0.5Ibvar	β Lyr variable
				198820	102993	20^{h} 52^{m} 00.39^{s}	+32° 50′ 56.1″	6.42	−2.47	1952	B3III	
				185268	96503	19^{h} 37^{m} 09.62^{s}	+29° 20′ 01.4″	6.43	−0.71	874	B5V	
				195506	101133	20^{h} 29^{m} 59.87^{s}	+45° 55′ 41.5″	6.43	0.91	415	K2+...	
				185435	96546	19^{h} 37^{m} 40.82^{s}	+35° 01′ 21.2″	6.44	−2.11	1672	K5	
				189377	98253	19^{h} 57^{m} 56.12^{s}	+42° 15′ 38.9″	6.44	−1.51	1268	A3V	
				194882	100714	20^{h} 25^{m} 05.00^{s}	+59° 36′ 00.4″	6.44	−0.88	948	A3III	
				207088	107445	21^{h} 45^{m} 44.45^{s}	+35° 51′ 26.2″	6.44	0.51	499	G8III	
				197101	101900	20^{h} 39^{m} 00.19^{s}	+56° 00′ 17.8″	6.45	0.88	424	F2Vn	
				202654	104962	21^{h} 15^{m} 37.18^{s}	+47° 58′ 26.4″	6.45	−1.94	1552	B4IV	
				203358	105390	21^{h} 20^{m} 50.01^{s}	+32° 27′ 08.4″	6.45	2.13	239	G8IV	
				189253	98146	19^{h} 56^{m} 45.16^{s}	+50° 54′ 09.0″	6.46	1.30	350	A1V	
V1773 Cyg			V1773	193536	100142	20^{h} 18^{m} 49.67^{s}	+46° 19′ 20.0″	6.46	−3.09	2650	B2V	
				201836	104537	21^{h} 10^{m} 30.96^{s}	+47° 41′ 32.0″	6.46	−1.86	1502	B6IV	
HD 203857				203857	105637	21^{h} 23^{m} 48.39^{s}	+37° 21′ 05.4″	6.46	−0.79	921	K5	has a possible planet
				185264	96396	19^{h} 35^{m} 55.95^{s}	+50° 14′ 18.7″	6.47	0.11	609	G9III	
				185657	96572	19^{h} 37^{m} 56.68^{s}	+49° 17′ 02.6″	6.47	0.53	503	G6V	
				192538	99719	20^{h} 14^{m} 04.87^{s}	+36° 36′ 17.6″	6.47	−0.98	1009	A0V	
				192987	99929	20^{h} 16^{m} 28.15^{s}	+37° 03′ 23.0″	6.47	−1.25	1140	B6III	
				195690	101268	20^{h} 31^{m} 36.27^{s}	+34° 19′ 49.8″	6.47	3.20	147	F2	
				200030	103596	20^{h} 59^{m} 24.61^{s}	+42° 19′ 28.0″	6.47	−0.39	767	B9	
X Cyg			X	197572	102276	20^{h} 43^{m} 24.20^{s}	+35° 35′ 16.1″	6.48	−2.68	2218	G8Ib	Cepheid variable
				207673	107749	21^{h} 49^{m} 40.10^{s}	+41° 08′ 55.7″	6.48	−5.62	8579	A2Ib	
V1276 Cyg			V1276	186357	96988	19^{h} 42^{m} 49.10^{s}	+29° 19′ 54.0″	6.49		266	F1III	δ Sct variable
				191892	99294	20^{h} 09^{m} 22.37^{s}	+56° 01′ 36.7″	6.49	−1.41	1240	K0	
V1584 Cyg			V1584	193722	100250	20^{h} 19^{m} 56.04^{s}	+46° 50′ 14.3″	6.49	−1.38	1221	B9p Si	α^{2}CVn variable
				194668	100651	20^{h} 24^{m} 32.36^{s}	+53° 33′ 06.9″	6.49	−1.77	1462	B9.5III	
				196134	101467	20^{h} 33^{m} 48.56^{s}	+41° 46′ 22.2″	6.50	1.56	317	K0III-IV	
				200465	103822	21^{h} 02^{m} 20.96^{s}	+39° 30′ 32.5″	6.50	−1.68	1411	A1V comp	
				200595	103871	21^{h} 02^{m} 48.62^{s}	+45° 50′ 56.0″	6.50	−1.59	1353	B3Vn	
HD 185269				185269	96507	19^{h} 37^{m} 11.74^{s}	+28° 29′ 59.5″	6.67	3.29	155	G0IV	has a planet (b)
HD 197037				197037	101948	20^{h} 39^{m} 33^{s}	+42° 14′ 55″	6.81		108	F7V	has a planet (b)
CH Cygni				182917	95413	19^{h} 24^{m} 33.07^{s}	+50° 14′ 29.1″	7.08		900	M3III	Z And and SR variable
WR 136				192163	99546	20^{h} 12^{m} 06.54^{s}	+38° 21′ 17.8″	7.48	−3.57	5279	WN6	Wolf–Rayet Star
KELT-9				195689	101252	20^{h} 31^{m} 26.35^{s}	+39° 56′ 19.8″	7.56	1.18	615	A0	The hottest planet-bearing star with the hottest planet
HD 187123				187123	97336	19^{h} 46^{m} 58.11^{s}	+34° 25′ 10.3″	7.86	4.46	163	G5	has two planets (b & c)
χ Cyg	χ			187796	97629	19^{h} 50^{m} 33.94^{s}	+32° 54′ 50.9″	7.91	2.78	346	S7,1e:	Mira variable; V_{max} = 3.62^{m}, V_{min} = 15.00^{m}
HD 191806				191806	99306	20^{h} 09^{m} 28.3^{s}	+52° 16′ 35″	8.09	3.99	215	G0V	has a massive planet (b)
R Cyg				185456		19^{h} 36^{m} 49.38^{s}	+50° 11′ 59.5″	8.15			S...	Mira variable
RT Cyg				186686	97068	19^{h} 43^{m} 37.90^{s}	+48° 46′ 39.0″	8.45	−1.85	3749	M3e	Mira variable
HD 332231				332231		20^{h} 26^{m} 57.9^{s}	+33° 44′ 40″	8.56		28	F8	has a planet (b)
U Cyg			U	193680	100219	20^{h} 19^{m} 36.40^{s}	+47° 53′ 38.0″	8.77	−1.00	2938	R....	Mira variable
Cygnus X-1				226868	98298	19^{h} 58^{m} 21.68^{s}	+35° 12′ 05.8″	8.95	−2.23	>6000	O9.7Iab	V1357 Cyg; X-ray binary one component being a black hole
47 Cyg B		47		196094		20^{h} 33^{m} 52.50^{s}	+35° 13′ 07.0″	9.40			K2Ib+...	component of 47 Cyg system
Kepler-409						19^{h} 34^{m} 43.0^{s}	+46° 51′ 10″	9.44		218		has a transiting planet (b)
HAT-P-11						19^{h} 50^{m} 50.25^{s}	+48° 04′ 51.1″	9.59	6.69	123	K4	has two transiting planets (b and c)
Kepler-68						19^{h} 24^{m} 08.0^{s}	+49° 02′ 25″	10.1		440		has three transiting planets (b, c and d)
Kepler-1652						19^{h} 37^{m} 27.8^{s}	+49° 54′ 54″	16.86		822	M2V	has a transiting planet (b)
Kepler-96						19^{h} 48^{m} 16.7^{s}	+40° 31′ 30″	10.3				has a transiting planet (b)
Campbell's star				184738	96295	19^{h} 34^{m} 45.24^{s}	+30° 30′ 58.9″	10.45			WC...	V1966 Cyg
HAT-P-7						19^{h} 28^{m} 59^{s}	+47° 58′ 10″	10.5		1044	F8	has a transiting planet (b)
HAT-P-17						21^{h} 38^{m} 09^{s}	+30° 29′ 19″	10.54		293.5	G0	has two planets (b & c)
Kepler-50						19^{h} 12^{m} 24.0^{s}	+50° 02′ 01″	11				has two transiting planets (b and c)
Kepler-1658						19^{h} 37^{m} 26.0^{s}	+38° 56′ 51″	11				has a transiting planet (b)
WASP-48						19^{h} 24^{m} 39^{s}	+55° 28′ 23″	11.06				has a transiting planet (b)
Kepler-449						19^{h} 34^{m} 55.9^{s}	+41° 54′ 03″	11.41				has two transiting planets (b & c)
Kepler-448						19^{h} 49^{m} 48.9^{s}	+41° 00′ 40″	11.51		1389		has two transiting planets (b and c)
Kepler-22						19^{h} 16^{m} 52.2^{s}	+47° 53′ 4.2″	11.66		590	G5	has a transiting planet (b) in its habitable zone
Kepler-450						19^{h} 41^{m} 56.8^{s}	+51° 00′ 49″	11.68				has three transiting planets (b, c & d)
KIC 8462852						20^{h} 06^{m} 15.5^{s}	+44° 27′ 24.61″	11.71	3.74	1277	F3V	Tabby's Star, Boyajian's Star, WTF Star
KIC 11026764						19^{h} 21^{m} 24.62539^{s}	+48° 30′ 53.3184″	9.71	3.6	565	G1	nicknamed "Gemma" by Li et al.; diameter 2.18 times the Sun; aged at 5.94 billion years; weak quasi-periodic pulsations at 0.9 mHz.
Kepler-462						19^{h} 59^{m} 17.0^{s}	+43° 48′ 51″	11.73				has two transiting planets (b & c)
Kepler-145						19^{h} 25^{m} 33.0^{s}	+44° 31′ 45″	11.9				has a transiting planet (b & c)
Kepler-36						19^{h} 25^{m} 00.0^{s}	+49° 13′ 55″	12				has two transiting planets (b and c)
Kepler-78						19^{h} 34^{m} 58.0^{s}	+44° 26′ 54″	12			G	has a transiting planet (b)
Kepler-63						19^{h} 16^{m} 54.0^{s}	+49° 32′ 54″	12.02		652		has a transiting planet (b)
KIC 9832227						19^{h} 29^{m} 15.948^{s}	+46° 37′ 19.89″	12.27 – 12.46		1800		Contact binary set to merge in 2022
Kepler-89						19^{h} 49^{m} 20.0^{s}	+41° 53′ 28″	12.4				has four transiting planets (b, c, d and e)
Kepler-411						19^{h} 10^{m} 25.3^{s}	+49° 31′ 24″	12.5				has four transiting planets (b, c, d and e)
Kepler-539						19^{h} 56^{m} 29.0^{s}	+41° 52′ 00″	12.5			G2V	has two transiting planets (b and c)
Kepler-406						19^{h} 27^{m} 23.5^{s}	+44° 58′ 06″	12.52				has two transiting planets (b and c)
Kepler-106						20^{h} 03^{m} 27.4^{s}	+44° 20′ 15″	12.88				has four transiting planets (b, c, d & e)
Kepler-289						19^{h} 49^{m} 51.7^{s}	+42° 52′ 58″	14.1		2283		has three transiting planets (b, c & d)
Kepler-56						19^{h} 35^{m} 02.0^{s}	+41° 52′ 19″	13				has three transiting planets (b, c and d)
Kepler-432						19^{h} 33^{m} 08.0^{s}	+48° 17′ 09″	13		2851	K2III	has two transiting planets (b and c)
Kepler-48						19^{h} 56^{m} 33.0^{s}	+40° 56′ 56″	13.04				has four transiting planets (b, c, d & e)
Kepler-452						19^{h} 44^{m} 0.9^{s}	+44° 16′ 39.2″	13.426		1400	G2V	has at least one transiting planet (Kepler-452b)
Kepler-113						19^{h} 11^{m} 59.5^{s}	+50° 56′ 40″	13.46				has two transiting planets (b & c)
Kepler-69						19^{h} 33^{m} 03.0^{s}	+44° 52′ 08″	13.7			G4V	has two transiting planets (b & c)
KIC 11145123						19^{h} 41^{m} 25.3^{s}	+48° 45′ 15″	13		3910	A	δ Scuti variable; one of the slowest rotators
Kepler-114						19^{h} 36^{m} 29.0^{s}	+48° 20′ 58″	13.7				has three transiting planets (b, c & d)
Kepler-6						19^{h} 47^{m} 20.94^{s}	+48° 14′ 23.9″	13.8	4.4	2522	G4	has a transiting planet (b)
Kepler-5						19^{h} 57^{m} 37.68^{s}	+50° 02′ 06.2″	13.9	3.3	4167	F8	has a transiting planet (b)
Kepler-23						19^{h} 36^{m} 52.0^{s}	+49° 28′ 45″	14				has three transiting planets (b, c and d)
Kepler-76						19^{h} 36^{m} 46.0^{s}	+39° 37′ 08″	14				has a transiting planet (b)
Kepler-33						19^{h} 16^{m} 19.0^{s}	+46° 00′ 19″	14				has five transiting planets (b, c, d, e and f)
Kepler-419						19^{h} 41^{m} 40.0^{s}	+51° 11′ 05″	14				has two transiting planets (b & c)
Kepler-435						19^{h} 29^{m} 09.0^{s}	+43° 11′ 50″	14			6751	has a transiting planet (b)
Kepler-307						19^{h} 51^{m} 11.0^{s}	+40° 25′ 04″	14.1				has two transiting planets (b & c)
Kepler-79						20^{h} 02^{m} 04.1^{s}	+44° 22′ 54″	14.11				has four transiting planets (b, c, d & e)
Kepler-11						19^{h} 48^{m} 28^{s}	+41° 54′ 33″	14.2		1999	G	has six transiting planets (b, c, d, e, f & g)
Kepler-74						19^{h} 32^{m} 22.0^{s}	+41° 21′ 20″	14.23		4338	F8V	has a transiting planet (b)
Kepler-39						19^{h} 47^{m} 50.0^{s}	+46° 02′ 04″	14.3		3914	F7IV	has a transiting planet (b)
Kepler-210						19^{h} 30^{m} 01.0^{s}	+43° 04′ 59″	14.4			K	has two transiting planets (b & c)
Kepler-424						19^{h} 54^{m} 30.0^{s}	+48° 34′ 39″	14.5				has two transiting planets (b & c)
Kepler-41						19^{h} 38^{m} 03.0^{s}	+45° 58′ 54″	14.5		2381	G2V	has a transiting planets (b)
Kepler-433						19^{h} 50^{m} 22.0^{s}	+40° 58′ 38″	14.5		6099		has a transiting planets (b)
Kepler-40						19^{h} 47^{m} 15.0^{s}	+47° 31′ 36″	14.76		8806	F5IV	has a transiting planet (b)
Kepler-437						19^{h} 49^{m} 23.0^{s}	+44° 01′ 37″	14.8		1360		has a transiting planet (b)
Kepler-70						19^{h} 45^{m} 25.0^{s}	+41° 05′ 34″	14.87		3849	sdB	has two transiting planets (b & c)
Kepler-418						19^{h} 37^{m} 44.0^{s}	+38° 21′ 20″	15				has two transiting planets (b and c)
Kepler-85						19^{h} 23^{m} 54.0^{s}	+45° 17′ 25″	15				has four transiting planets (b, c, d & e)
Kepler-87						19^{h} 51^{m} 40.0^{s}	+46° 57′ 54″	15				has two transiting planets (b and c)
Kepler-51						19^{h} 45^{m} 55.0^{s}	+49° 56′ 16″	15.0				has three transiting planets (b, c and d)
Kepler-77						19^{h} 18^{m} 25.9^{s}	+44° 20′ 44″	15.0		1859	G5V	has a transiting planet (b)
Kepler-80						19^{h} 44^{m} 27.0^{s}	+39° 58′ 44″	15.0				has six transiting planets (b, c, d, e, f and g)
Kepler-61						19^{h} 41^{m} 13.0^{s}	+42° 28′ 31″	15.0			K7V	has a transiting planet (b)
Kepler-44						20^{h} 00^{m} 25.0^{s}	+45° 45′ 44″	15.0		7339	G2IV	has a transiting planet (b)
Kepler-84						19^{h} 53^{m} 00.5^{s}	+40° 29′ 46″	15.03				has five transiting planets (b, c, d, e & f)
Kepler-58						19^{h} 45^{m} 26.0^{s}	+39° 06′ 55″	15.3				has three transiting planets (b, c and d)
Kepler-66						19^{h} 35^{m} 56.0^{s}	+46° 41′ 16″	15.3		3611	GOV	has a transiting planet (b)
Kepler-46						19^{h} 17^{m} 05.0^{s}	+42° 36′ 15″	15.3		2795		has three transiting planets (b, c & d)
Kepler-71						19^{h} 39^{m} 27.7^{s}	+46° 17′ 09″	15.39				has a transiting planet (b)
Kepler-49						19^{h} 29^{m} 11.0^{s}	+40° 35′ 30″	15.5				has four transiting planets (b, c, d and e)
Kepler-57						19^{h} 34^{m} 34.0^{s}	+44° 39′ 25″	15.5				has two transiting planets (b and c)
Kepler-31						19^{h} 36^{m} 06.0^{s}	+45° 51′ 11″	15.5				has three transiting planets (b, c and d)
Kepler-29						19^{h} 53^{m} 24.0^{s}	+47° 29′ 28″	15.5				has two transiting planets (b and c)
Kepler-81						19^{h} 34^{m} 32.9^{s}	+42° 49′ 30″	15.56				has three transiting planets (b, c & d)
Kepler-186						19^{h} 54^{m} 36.651^{s}	+43° 57′ 18.06″	~15.65		492±59	M1V	has five transiting planets (b, c, d, e and f)
Kepler-305						19^{h} 56^{m} 54.0^{s}	+40° 20′ 35″	15.8				has two transiting planets (b & c)
Kepler-32						19^{h} 51^{m} 22^{s}	+46° 34′ 27″	16				has five transiting planets (b, c, d, e and f)
Kepler-1520						19^{h} 23^{m} 52.0^{s}	+51° 30′ 17″	16		1533	K4V	has a transiting planets (b)
Kepler-42						19^{h} 28^{m} 53.0^{s}	+44° 37′ 10″	16.12		126		has three transiting planets (c, b and d)
Kepler-443						19^{h} 14^{m} 27.0^{s}	+49° 58′ 07″	16.2		2541		has a transiting planet (b)
Kepler-54						19^{h} 39^{m} 06.0^{s}	+43° 03′ 23″	16.3				has three transiting planets (b, c and d)
Kepler-436						20^{h} 06^{m} 53.0^{s}	+44° 24′ 43″	16.3		2016		has two transiting planets (b and c)
Kepler-67						19^{h} 36^{m} 37.0^{s}	+46° 09′ 59″	16.4		3611	G9V	has a transiting planet (b)
Kepler-45						19^{h} 31^{m} 30.0^{s}	+41° 03′ 51″	16.88		1086	M	has a transiting planet (b)
V1500 Cyg			V1500			21^{h} 11^{m} 36.61^{s}	+48° 09′ 01.9″	17.1				Nova Cygni 1975; V_{max} = 2.0^{m}
Kepler-445						19^{h} 54^{m} 57.0^{s}	+46° 29′ 55″	18		294		has three transiting planet (b, c & d)
V476 Cyg			V476			19^{h} 58^{m} 24.57^{s}	+53° 37′ 07.1″			200		Nova Cygni 1920; V_{max} = 2.0^{m}
V1668 Cyg			V1668			21^{h} 42^{m} 35.22^{s}	+44° 01′ 54.9″					Nova Cygni 1978; V_{max} = 6.0^{m}
AFGL 2591						20^{h} 29^{m} 24.9^{s}	+40° 11′ 21″			3261.6		associated Rfn Nebula
PSR B2016+28						20^{h} 18^{m} 03.92^{s}	+29° 39′ 55.2″					pulsar
V1974 Cyg			V1974			20^{h} 30^{m} 31.61^{s}	+52° 37′ 51.3″					Nova Cygni 1992; V_{max} = 4.5^{m}
Kepler-47						19^{h} 41^{m} 11.5^{s}	+46° 55′ 12″					has three transiting planets (b, d and c).
Table legend: • Name = Proper name • B = Bayer designation • F or/and G. = Flamsteed designation or Gould designation • Var = Variable-star designation • HD = Henry Draper Catalogue designation number • HIP = Hipparcos Catalogue designation number • RA = Right ascension for the Epoch/Equinox J2000.0 • Dec = Declination for the Epoch/Equinox J2000.0 • vis. mag. = visual magnitude (m or m_{v}), also known as apparent magnitude • abs. mag. = absolute magnitude (M_{v}) • Dist. (ly) = Distance in light-years from Earth • Sp. class = Spectral class of the star in the stellar classification system • Notes = Common name(s) or alternate name(s); comments; notable properties [for example: multiple star status, range of variability if it is a variable star, exoplanets, etc.]

== See also ==
- List of stars by constellation
