= V1668 Cygni =

Nova that appeared in 1978

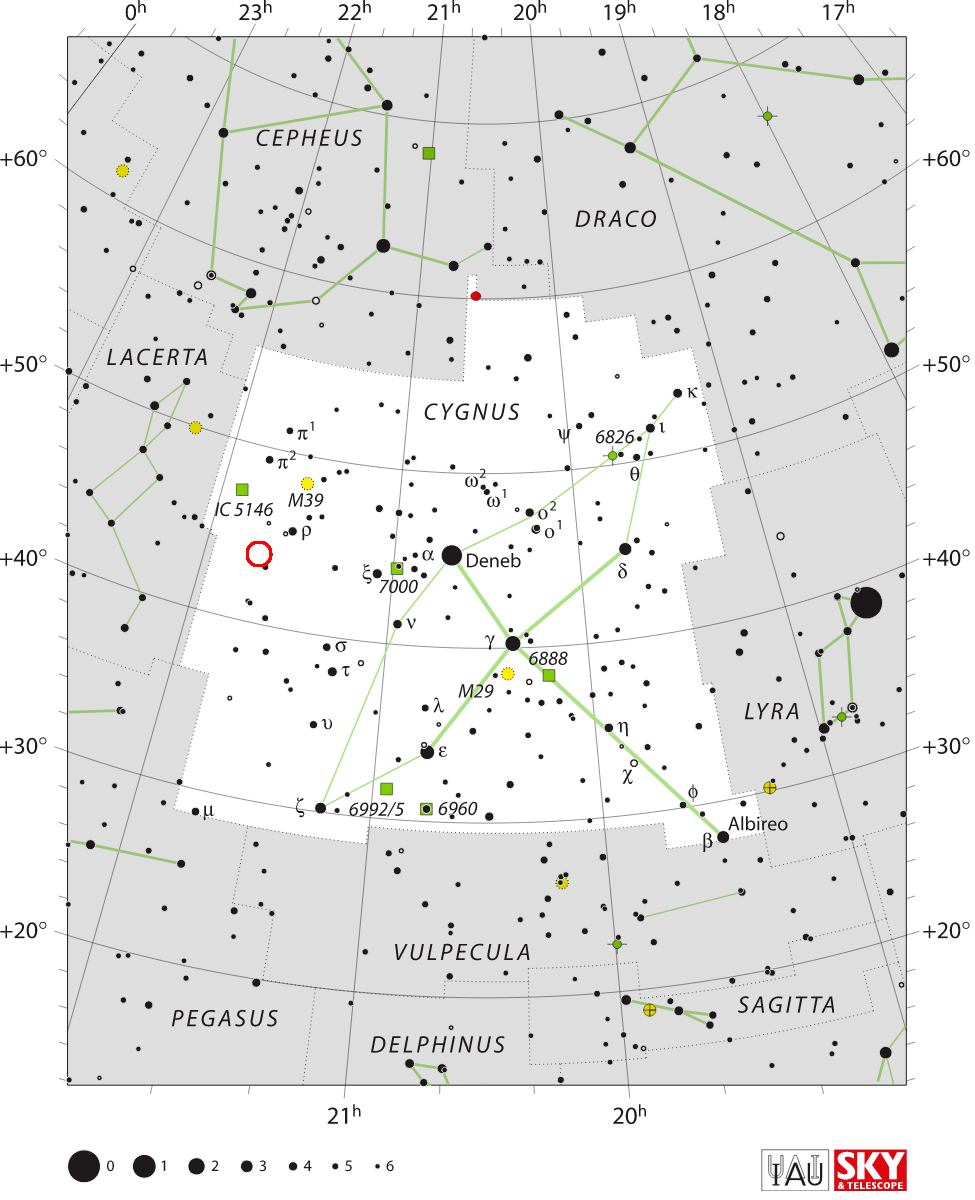
- Location of V1668 Cygni (circled in red)

Observation data Epoch J2000.0 Equinox ICRS
- Constellation: Cygnus
- Right ascension: 21^{h} 42^{m} 35.22^{s}
- Declination: +44° 01′ 54.9″
- Apparent magnitude (V): 6.2 (max)

Characteristics
- Variable type: Nova

Astrometry
Distance	17,600 ly (5,400 pc)
Absolute magnitude (M_{V})	−7.5±0.5 (max)

Details

White dwarf
Mass	0.98 M_{☉}

Other designations
- Nova Cyg 1978, AAVSO 2138+43B, V1668 Cyg

Database references
SIMBAD	data

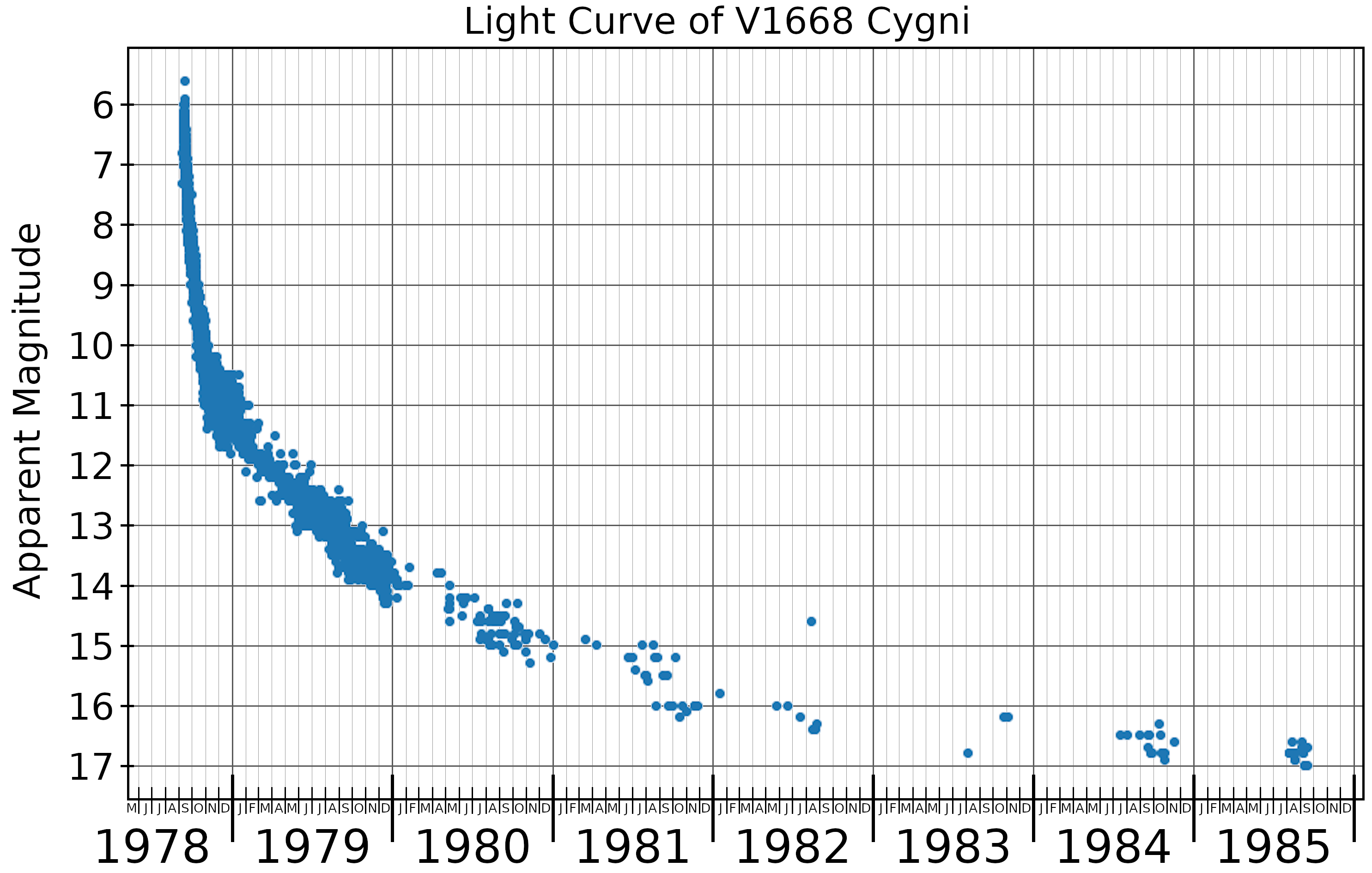
The light curve of V1668 Cygni, plotted from AAVSO data

V1668 Cygni was a nova that appeared in the northern constellation of Cygnus, situated a couple of degrees to the southeast of the star Rho Cygni. It was discovered by Canadian variable star observer Warren Morrison on September 10, 1978, and reached a peak brightness of around 6.22 apparent magnitude on September 12. The luminosity of the source at this time was about 100,000 times the brightness of the Sun, and likely remained at that level for several months. The expansion velocity of the nova shell was deduced through spectroscopy to be 1,300 km/s.

After peak brightness, the lightcurve showed a smooth power-law decline with no major fluctuations. The decline in brightness was rapid, dropping by three magnitudes in 24 days. An optically thin shell of dust was created by the outburst that reached peak opacity after 50–60 days. The lack of a silicate feature in the infrared spectrum of this shell suggests the dust grains consisted of graphite, possibly condensed on atoms of cohenite. A 1994 analysis of the light curve showed the mass of the white dwarf source is about equal to the Sun.

Warren Morrison was awarded the 1979 Ken Chilton prize of the RASC primarily for this discovery.
