= HD 197037 =

Binary star system in the constellation of Cygnus

Observation data Epoch J2000 Equinox ICRS
- Constellation: Cygnus
- A
- Right ascension: 20^{h} 39^{m} 32.95994^{s}
- Declination: +42° 14′ 54.7783″
- Apparent magnitude (V): 6.813
- B
- Right ascension: 20^{h} 39^{m} 32.93627^{s}
- Declination: +42° 14′ 51.1696″

Characteristics

HD 197037 A
- Evolutionary stage: main sequence
- Spectral type: F7V

HD 197037 B
- Spectral type: M

Astrometry

A
Radial velocity (R_{v})	9.087±0.199 km/s
Proper motion (μ)	RA: −62.745 mas/yr Dec.: −222.168 mas/yr
Parallax (π)	30.2286±0.0143 mas
Distance	107.90 ± 0.05 ly (33.08 ± 0.02 pc)
Absolute magnitude (M_{V})	4.26

B
Proper motion (μ)	RA: −54.165 mas/yr Dec.: −227.397 mas/yr
Parallax (π)	30.3173±0.0339 mas
Distance	107.6 ± 0.1 ly (32.98 ± 0.04 pc)

Position (relative to HD 197037 A)
Component	HD 197037 B
Epoch of observation	2013
Angular distance	3.676±0.011″
Position angle	182.21±0.18°
Projected separation	121 AU

Details

HD 197037 A
Mass	1.063±0.022 M_{☉}
Radius	1.105±0.023 R_{☉}
Luminosity	1.568±0.074 L_{☉}
Surface gravity (log g)	4.37±0.04 cgs
Temperature	6137±20 K
Metallicity [Fe/H]	−0.16±0.03 dex
Rotation	19.1 d
Age	3.408±0.924 Gyr

HD 197037 B
Mass	0.3412^{+0.0098}_{−0.0477} M_{☉}
Radius	0.16 R_{☉}
Luminosity	0.01 L_{☉}
Temperature	4,766 K

Other designations
- BD+41 3845, HIP 101948, LTT 16037, NLTT 49662, TYC 3161-126-1, 2MASS J20393296+4214549

Database references
SIMBAD	data

HD 197037 is a binary star system. Its primary or visible star, HD 197037 A, is a F-type main-sequence star. Its surface temperature is 6150±34 K. HD 197037 A is depleted in heavy elements compared to the Sun, with a metallicity Fe/H index of −0.16±0.03, but is younger at an age of 3.408±0.924 billion years.

A multiplicity survey detected a red dwarf stellar companion HD 197037 B in 2016, at a projected separation of 121 AU. The existence of other stellar companions at projected separations from 1.62 to 45.26 AU was excluded.

== Planetary system ==
In 2012 one planet, named HD 197037 Ab, was discovered on a wide, eccentric orbit by the radial velocity method.

Another planet in the system was initially suspected, but the radial velocity signal was later attributed to the stellar companion HD 197037 B.

The HD 197037 A planetary system
Companion (in order from star)	Mass	Semimajor axis (AU)	Orbital period (days)	Eccentricity	Inclination (°)	Radius
b	≥0.79±0.05 M_{J}	2.07±0.05	1035.7±13	0.22±0.07	—	—
