= Kepler-445 =

Star in the constellation Cygnus

Observation data Epoch J2000 Equinox ICRS
- Constellation: Cygnus
- Right ascension: 19^{h} 54^{m} 56.65923^{s}
- Declination: +46° 29′ 54.7936″
- Apparent magnitude (V): 18.19

Characteristics
- Evolutionary stage: Main sequence
- Spectral type: M4V
- Apparent magnitude (G): 16.685±0.003
- Apparent magnitude (J): 13.542±0.029
- Apparent magnitude (H): 12.929±0.035
- Apparent magnitude (K): 12.610±0.028

Astrometry
Proper motion (μ)	RA: 41.465 mas/yr Dec.: 132.351 mas/yr
Parallax (π)	8.1366±0.0457 mas
Distance	401 ± 2 ly (122.9 ± 0.7 pc)

Details
Mass	0.334+0.080 −0.059 M_{☉}
Radius	0.347+0.068 −0.049 R_{☉}
Luminosity (bolometric)	0.0115 L_{☉}
Temperature	3219+89 −63 K
Metallicity [Fe/H]	+0.27 dex

Other designations
- Kepler-445, KOI-2704, KIC 9730163, TIC 268060194, 2MASS J19545665+4629548

Database references
SIMBAD	data
Exoplanet Archive	data

Kepler-445 is a red dwarf star located 401 light-years (123 parsecs) away in the constellation Cygnus. It hosts three known exoplanets, discovered by the transit method using data from the Kepler space telescope and confirmed in 2015. None of the planets orbit within the habitable zone. (Note: "[...] all of the planets are likely too hot to be located within their host stars’ habitable zones [...]")

== Planetary system ==
Kepler-445b, c, and d orbit Kepler-445 every 3, 5, and 8 days, and have equilibrium temperatures of 401 K (128 °C; 262 °F), 341 K (68 °C; 154 °F), and 305 K (32 °C; 89 °F), respectively. With a radius of 2.72 times that of Earth, Kepler-445c is likely a mini-Neptune with a volatile-rich composition, and has been compared to GJ 1214 b. Kepler-445d is only slightly larger than the Earth, with a radius of 1.33 R_{🜨}.

The Kepler-445 planetary system
Companion (in order from star)	Mass	Semimajor axis (AU)	Orbital period (days)	Eccentricity	Inclination (°)	Radius
b	—	0.023656	2.98416640+0.00000891 −0.00000936	0.02+0.16 −0.02	89.74+0.18 −0.28	1.74+0.29 −0.28 R_{🜨}
c	—	0.033427	4.87122714+0.00000636 −0.00000638	0.01+0.16 −0.01	89.91+0.07 −0.10	2.72+0.44 −0.43 R_{🜨}
d	—	0.047121	8.15272856+0.00006453 −0.00007041	0.01+0.16 −0.01	89.61+0.27 −0.25	1.33+0.25 −0.23 R_{🜨}
