= Kepler-87c =

Super-puff

Discovery
- Discovered by: Ofir et al.
- Discovery date: 8 October 2013
- Detection method: Transit (Kepler Mission)

Orbital characteristics
- Semi-major axis: 0.664 AU (99,300,000 km)
- Eccentricity: 0.039
- Orbital period (sidereal): 191 d
- Inclination: 89.588
- Star: Kepler-87 (KOI-1574)

Physical characteristics
- Mean radius: 6.14±0.29 R_{🜨}
- Mass: 6.4±0.8 M_{🜨}
- Mean density: 0.152 g/cm^{3} (0.0055 lb/cu in)
- Temperature: 403 K (130 °C; 266 °F)

Kepler-87c is a planet orbiting Kepler-87, a star slightly more massive than the Sun and nearing the end of its main-sequence period.

== Characteristics ==
Despite being larger than Neptune, Kepler-87c is only about 6.4 times more massive than Earth. This means that its density is only 0.152 g/cm^{3}. This makes it the first Super-puff, a planet with such low density. Its equilibrium temperature is 130 °C.
