= Kepler-71 =

G-type main-sequence star

Observation data Epoch J2000 Equinox ICRS
- Constellation: Cygnus
- Right ascension: 19^{h} 37^{m} 27.716^{s}
- Declination: 46° 17′ 08.941″
- Apparent magnitude (V): 15.06

Characteristics
- Evolutionary stage: main sequence
- Spectral type: G8V
- V−R color index: −0.29
- R−I color index: 0.46
- J−H color index: 0.377
- J−K color index: 0.457
- Variable type: ROT

Astrometry
| Radial velocity (R_{v}) | −23.88±0.02 km/s |
| Proper motion (μ) | RA: −2.379±0.021 mas/yr Dec.: −0.983±0.022 mas/yr |
| Parallax (π) | 1.0647±0.0204 mas |
| Distance | 3,060 ± 60 ly (940 ± 20 pc) |

Details
| Mass | 0.923 M_{☉} |
| Radius | 0.816 R_{☉} |
| Surface gravity (log g) | 4.54±0.01 cgs |
| Temperature | 5,545 K |
| Metallicity [Fe/H] | 0.22 dex |
| Rotation | period 20 days |
| Age | 2.5-4 Gyr |

Other designations
- KOI-217, BOKS 40959, KIC 9595827, 2MASS J19392772+4617090, Gaia DR2 2080095679848047872

Database references
| SIMBAD | data |

Kepler-71 is a yellow main sequence star in the constellation of Cygnus.

== Star characteristics ==
Kepler-71 is enriched by heavy elements at 170% of Sun metallicity, young and has a very prominent starspot activity. Starspots are covering about 40% of star surface at transit latitudes, each planetary transit passing over an average six starspots. The bright facula regions are even more extensive. Unlike Sun, the photosphere of Kepler-71 rotates nearly like rigid body, with differential rotation not exceeding 2%.

== Planetary system ==
The "Hot Jupiter" class planet Kepler-71b was discovered around Kepler-71 in 2010.

The Kepler-71 planetary system
| Companion (in order from star) | Mass | Semimajor axis (AU) | Orbital period (days) | Eccentricity | Inclination (°) | Radius |
|---|---|---|---|---|---|---|
| b | — | 0.05029^{+0.00002}_{−0.00006} | 3.905079476^{+0.000008}_{−0.000009} | 0 | 89.8^{+0.2}_{−0.4} | 1.1987±0.0044 R_{J} |
