= Kepler-31 =

Star in the constellation Cygnus

Observation data Epoch J2000 Equinox J2000
- Constellation: Cygnus
- Right ascension: 19^{h} 36^{m} 05.5270^{s}
- Declination: +45° 51′ 11.108″
- Apparent magnitude (V): 14.0

Characteristics
- Evolutionary stage: main sequence
- Spectral type: G5

Astrometry
Proper motion (μ)	RA: −1.007(25) mas/yr Dec.: −7.439(23) mas/yr
Parallax (π)	0.6013±0.0200 mas
Distance	5,400 ± 200 ly (1,660 ± 60 pc)

Details
Mass	1.21±0.17 M_{☉}
Radius	1.22±0.24 R_{☉}
Luminosity	0.79±0.04 L_{☉}
Temperature	6,340±200 K
Metallicity [Fe/H]	−0.076±0.400 dex

Other designations
- KOI-935, KIC 9347899, 2MASS J19360552+4551110, Gaia DR2 2128013019361703936

Database references
SIMBAD	data
Exoplanet Archive	data
KIC	data

Kepler-31 is a star in the northern constellation of Cygnus, the swan. It is orbited by three known exoplanets. It is located at the celestial coordinates: Right Ascension 19^{h} 36^{m} 05.5270^{s}, Declination +45° 51′ 11.108″. With an apparent visual magnitude of 14.0, this star is too faint to be seen with the naked eye.

== Planetary system ==
The three gas giant planets orbiting Kepler-31 were discovered in early 2011, albeit with large false alarm probability, and were confirmed in 2012. The planets form a resonant chain, with orbital periods ratio 1:2:4, although 20% probability exists that these period ratios may be coincidental.

The Kepler-31 planetary system
Companion (in order from star)	Mass	Semimajor axis (AU)	Orbital period (days)	Eccentricity	Inclination	Radius
.04(unconfirmed)	—	0.0937	9.61730282±3.35e-5	—	—	0.173 R_{J}
b	<6.8 M_{J}	0.16	20.8613	—	—	0.38±0.07 R_{J}
c	<4.7 M_{J}	0.26	42.6318	—	—	0.38±0.07 R_{J}
d	—	0.39	87.648901±0.000801	—	—	0.407±0.099 R_{J}
