= Mu Cygni =

Star in the constellation Cygnus

- Location of μ Cygni (circled in red)

Observation data Epoch J2000 Equinox ICRS
- Constellation: Cygnus
- Right ascension: 21^{h} 44^{m} 08.57767^{s}
- Declination: +28° 44′ 33.4567″
- Apparent magnitude (V): 4.49

Characteristics
- Spectral type: F6V + G2V
- B−V color index: +0.512±0.007

Astrometry
Radial velocity (R_{v})	+16.95 km/s
Proper motion (μ)	RA: +257.012 mas/yr Dec.: −239.009 mas/yr
Parallax (π)	45.2207±0.2383 mas
Distance	72.1 ± 0.4 ly (22.1 ± 0.1 pc)
Absolute magnitude (M_{V})	2.75

μ^{1} Cyg
Absolute magnitude (M_{V})	2.77
Absolute bolometric magnitude (M_{bol})	2.91±0.06

μ^{2} Cyg
Absolute magnitude (M_{V})	4.38
Absolute bolometric magnitude (M_{bol})	4.32±0.06

Orbit
Period (P)	789 yr
Semi-major axis (a)	5.32″
Eccentricity (e)	0.66
Inclination (i)	75.5°
Longitude of the node (Ω)	110.1°
Periastron epoch (T)	1958.0
Argument of periastron (ω) (secondary)	145.7°

Details

μ^{1} Cyg
Mass	1.31 M_{☉}
Radius	1.88±0.07 R_{☉}
Luminosity	6.0 L_{☉}
Surface gravity (log g)	3.93 cgs
Temperature	6,354 K
Metallicity [Fe/H]	−0.16 dex
Rotational velocity (v sin i)	11.6 km/s
Age	3.46 Gyr

μ^{2} Cyg
Mass	0.99 M_{☉}
Radius	1.08±0.05 R_{☉}
Luminosity	1.4 L_{☉}
Surface gravity (log g)	4.33 cgs
Temperature	5,998 K
Metallicity [Fe/H]	−0.24 dex
Rotational velocity (v sin i)	6.4 km/s
Age	7.11 Gyr

Other designations
- 78 Cyg, BD+28°4169, HIP 107310, CCDM J21442+2845AB, WDS J21441+2845AB
- μ^{1} Cyg: HD 206826, HR 8309, SAO 89940
- μ^{2} Cyg: HD 206827, HR 8310, SAO 89939

Database references
SIMBAD	μ Cyg
- μ^{1} Cyg
- μ^{2} Cyg

Mu Cygni is a binary star system in the northern constellation of Cygnus. Its name is a Bayer designation that is Latinized from μ Cygni, and abbreviated Mu Cyg or μ Cyg. It is visible to the naked eye as a faint point of light with a combined apparent visual magnitude of 4.49. The system is located 72 light-years distant from the Sun, based on parallax, and is drifting further away with a radial velocity of +17 km/s.

The pair have an orbital period of around 800 years, with a semimajor axis of 5″ and an eccentricity around 0.6. The primary, with an apparent magnitude of 4.69, is an F-type main-sequence star with a stellar classification of F6V. It has 35% more mass than the Sun and 188% of the Sun's radius. The star is spinning with a projected rotational velocity of 9.6 km/s. The secondary companion, with an apparent magnitude of 6.12, is a G-type main-sequence star with a class of G2V. It has a similar radius as the Sun and slightly more mass.

Two reported additional components, C (apparent magnitude 12.93) and D (apparent magnitude 6.94), are believed to be optical doubles rather than part of the Mu Cygni system. Component D is the more distant spectroscopic binary HD 206874 (HIP 107326), consisting of two early F-type subgiants.
