= Kepler-84 =

Star in the constellation Cygnus

Observation data Epoch J2000 Equinox ICRS
- Constellation: Cygnus
- Right ascension: 19^{h} 53^{m} 00.48519^{s}
- Declination: +40° 29′ 45.9477″
- Apparent magnitude (V): 15.03

Characteristics
- Evolutionary stage: main sequence
- Spectral type: F

Astrometry
Proper motion (μ)	RA: −0.150 mas/yr Dec.: −2.872 mas/yr
Parallax (π)	0.6929±0.7043 mas
Distance	1,066 pc

Details
Mass	1.04 M_{☉}
Radius	1.17 R_{☉}
Luminosity	1.77 L_{☉}
Surface gravity (log g)	4.27 cgs
Temperature	6,091 K
Metallicity [Fe/H]	−0.13 dex
Rotation	20.21 days
Rotational velocity (v sin i)	4.5 km/s
Age	5.2 Gyr

Other designations
- Kepler-84, KOI-1589, KIC 5301750, 2MASS J19530049+4029458

Database references
SIMBAD	data
Exoplanet Archive	data

Kepler-84 is a Sun-like star 3,339 light-years from the Sun. It is a F-type star. The stellar radius measurement has a large uncertainty of 48% as in 2017, complicating the modelling of the star. The Kepler-84 star has two suspected stellar companions. Four stars, all more than four magnitudes fainter than Kepler-84, are seen within a few arcseconds and at least one is probably gravitationally bound to Kepler-84. Another, which has only a 0.005% chance of being a background star, is a yellow star with mass 0.855 M_{☉} at a projected separation of 0.18±0.05″ or 0.26″ (213.6 AU).

== Planetary system ==
Kepler-84 is orbited by five known planets, four small gas giants and a Super-Earth. Planets Kepler-84b and Kepler-84c were confirmed in 2012 while the rest was confirmed in 2014. To keep the known planetary system stable, no additional giant planets can be located within 7.4 AU from the parent stars.

The Kepler-84 planetary system
Companion (in order from star)	Mass	Semimajor axis (AU)	Orbital period (days)	Eccentricity	Inclination (°)	Radius
d	—	0.052	4.224537±0.000042	—	—	0.123±0.024 R_{J}
b	0.126±0.038 M_{J}	0.083	8.725854±0.00006	0	88.24	0.174±0.045 R_{J}
c	0.064±0.037 M_{J}	0.108	12.882525±0.000093	0	88.24	0.184±0.047 R_{J}
e	—	0.181	27.434389±0.000224	—	—	0.232±0.044 R_{J}
f	—	0.25	44.552169±0.000812	—	—	0.196±0.038 R_{J}
