= 47 Cygni =

Star in the constellation Cygnus

- Location of 47 Cygni (circled in red)

Observation data Epoch J2000 Equinox ICRS
- Constellation: Cygnus
- Right ascension: 20^{h} 33^{m} 54.18809^{s}
- Declination: +35° 15′ 03.0390″
- Apparent magnitude (V): 4.61 (4.84 + 7.30)

Characteristics
- Spectral type: K6: Ib + B2.5:
- B−V color index: 1.593±0.023
- Variable type: Lc

Astrometry
Radial velocity (R_{v})	−4.6±0.3 km/s
Proper motion (μ)	RA: −6.12 mas/yr Dec.: −4.166 mas/yr
Parallax (π)	0.8792±0.196 mas
Distance	4072+965 −773 ly (1249+296 −237 pc)
Absolute magnitude (M_{V})	−4.1 (−4 + −1.5)

Orbit
Period (P)	1117±11 d
Eccentricity (e)	0.00 (assumed)
Periastron epoch (T)	2,447,088±10 JD
Semi-amplitude (K_{1}) (primary)	2.0±0.1 km/s

Details

47 Cyg Aa
Mass	12.1±0.2; 19.4±3.9 M_{☉}
Radius	601 R_{☉}
Surface gravity (log g)	1.23 cgs
Temperature	4,217 K
Metallicity [Fe/H]	0.13 dex
Age	17.6±0.6 Myr

47 Cyg Ab
Mass	0.57 M_{☉}

47 Cyg B
Mass	10.96 M_{☉}

Other designations
- 47 Cyg, V2125 Cyg, BD+34°4079, GC 28630, HD 196093/196094, HIP 101474, HR 7866, SAO 70203, WDS J20339+3515, 2MASS J20335419+3515031

Database references
SIMBAD	data

47 Cygni is a triple star system in the northern constellation of Cygnus, and is located around 4,000 light years from the Earth. It is visible to the naked eye with a combined apparent visual magnitude of 4.61. The system is moving closer to the Earth with a heliocentric radial velocity of −4.6 km/s.

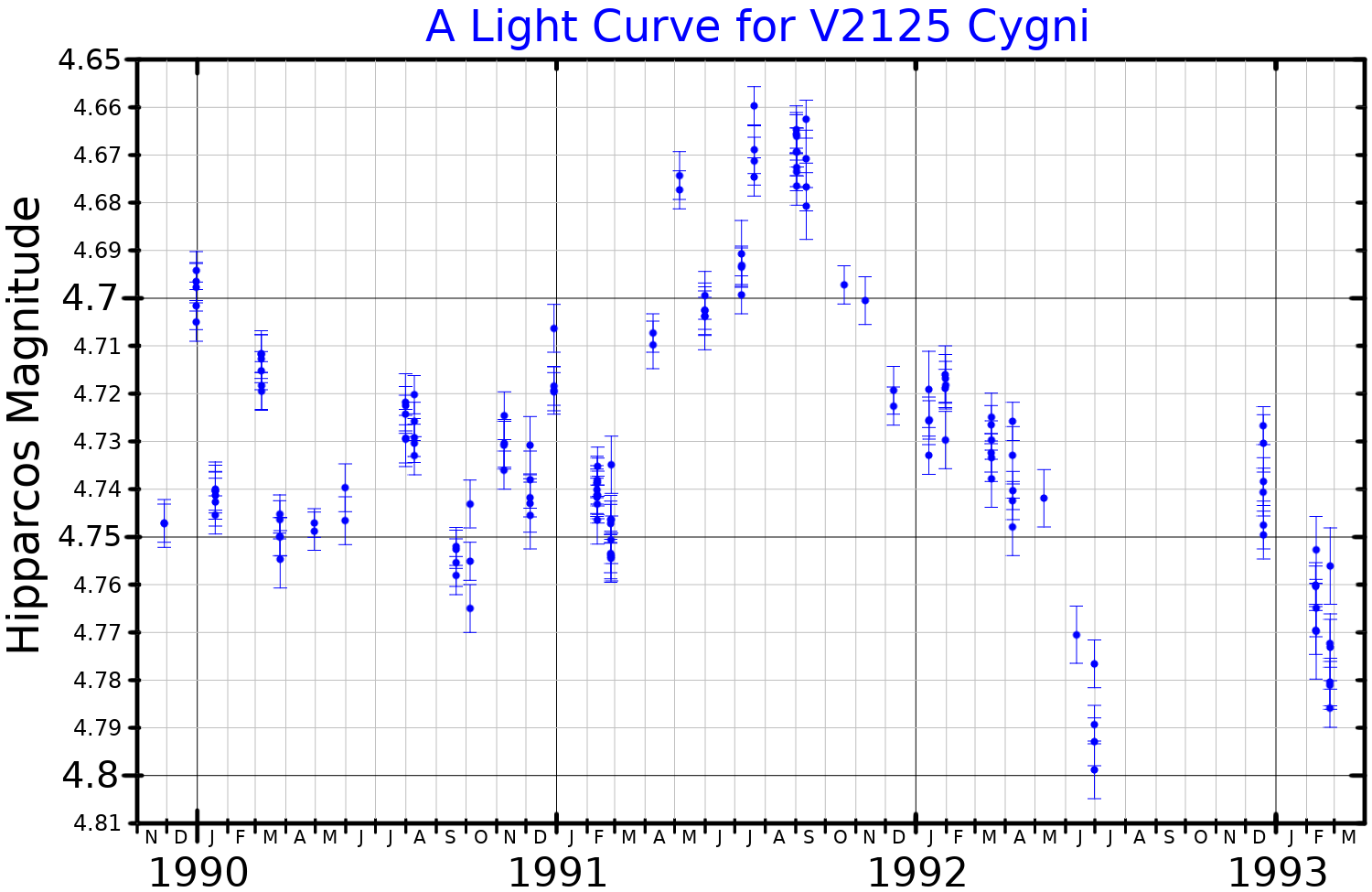
A light curve for V2125 Cygni, plotted from Hipparcos data

The dual nature of this system was recognized by Annie Cannon in 1912, and she assigned the pair separate Henry Draper Catalogue identifiers. They orbit each other with a period of around 143.69 yr. The primary component is itself a spectroscopic binary in a near circular orbit with a period of around 3.06 yr. The a sin i value for the primary is 30.8 ± 1.6 Gm (0.206 ± 0.011 AU), where a is the semimajor axis and i is the orbital inclination. It has been repeatedly resolved by speckle interferometery since 1973. Radio emission was detected from this system in 1985/86.

The supergiant primary is a slow irregular variable with an amplitude of about 0.1 magnitudes. Its angular diameter has been measured at 4.472±0.017 milliarcseconds using interferometry by the Navy Precision Optical Interferometer. At the distance of 1,249 parsecs, it yield a radius of 601 R_{☉}. Its close companion has 57% of the mass of the Sun. The secondary is a hot B-type main-sequence star, but still 2.5 magnitudes fainter than the primary.

It was once designated l Cygni (lowercase L) by John Flamsteed and was included in his Atlas Coelestis, but the designation is now dropped.
