= 71 Cygni =

Star in the constellation Cygnus

Observation data Epoch J2000 Equinox ICRS
- Constellation: Cygnus
- Right ascension: 21^{h} 29^{m} 26.94995^{s}
- Declination: +46° 32′ 26.1024″
- Apparent magnitude (V): 5.22

Characteristics
- Evolutionary stage: red clump
- Spectral type: K0− III
- B−V color index: 0.965±0.004

Astrometry
Radial velocity (R_{v})	−21.54±0.10 km/s
Proper motion (μ)	RA: +43.048 mas/yr Dec.: +104.683 mas/yr
Parallax (π)	15.4057±0.1077 mas
Distance	212 ± 1 ly (64.9 ± 0.5 pc)
Absolute magnitude (M_{V})	1.11

Details
Mass	2.05±0.09 M_{☉}
Radius	8.31±0.32 R_{☉}
Luminosity	44.7+7.8 −6.7 L_{☉}
Surface gravity (log g)	3.03±0.05 cgs
Temperature	4,983±18 K
Metallicity [Fe/H]	0.05±0.06 dex
Rotational velocity (v sin i)	2.03±0.85 km/s
Age	1.07±0.15 Gyr

Other designations
- g Cyg, 71 Cyg, BD+45°3558, FK5 807, HD 204771, HIP 106093, HR 8228, SAO 50934

Database references
SIMBAD	data

71 Cygni is a star in the northern constellation of Cygnus, located 212 light years from the Sun. 71 Cygni is the Flamsteed designation; it has the Bayer designation g Cygni. It is visible to the naked eye as a dim, orange-hued star with an apparent visual magnitude of 5.22. The star is moving closer to the Earth with a heliocentric radial velocity of −21.5 km/s.

At the age of one billion years, this is an evolved giant star with a stellar classification of K0− III, which means it has used up its core hydrogen and expanded. It is a red clump giant, indicating that it is on the horizontal branch of the Hertzsprung–Russell diagram and is generating energy by helium fusion at its center. The star has double the mass of the Sun and eight times the Sun's radius. It is radiating 45 times the Sun's luminosity from its enlarged photosphere at an effective temperature of 4,983 K.
