= T Cygni =

Variable star in the constellation Cygnus

- Location of T Cygni (circled in red)

Observation data Epoch J2000 Equinox ICRS
- Constellation: Cygnus
- A
- Right ascension: 20^{h} 47^{m} 10.75235^{s}
- Declination: +34° 22′ 26.8411″
- Apparent magnitude (V): 4.91 - 4.96
- B
- Right ascension: 20^{h} 47^{m} 11.44798^{s}
- Declination: +34° 22′ 21.7891″
- Apparent magnitude (V): 10.03

Characteristics
- Evolutionary stage: Red-giant branch (A)
- Spectral type: K3 III
- B−V color index: 1.294±0.003
- Variable type: Lb:

Astrometry

A
Radial velocity (R_{v})	−23.9±0.3 km/s
Proper motion (μ)	RA: +39.640 mas/yr Dec.: +7.826 mas/yr
Parallax (π)	7.7834±0.0730 mas
Distance	419 ± 4 ly (128 ± 1 pc)
Absolute magnitude (M_{V})	−0.74

B
Proper motion (μ)	RA: +39.613 mas/yr Dec.: +7,558 mas/yr
Parallax (π)	7.8768±0.0173 mas
Distance	414.1 ± 0.9 ly (127.0 ± 0.3 pc)

Details

A
Mass	4.5 M_{☉}
Radius	35 R_{☉}
Luminosity	374 L_{☉}
Surface gravity (log g)	2.00 cgs
Temperature	4,423 K
Metallicity [Fe/H]	−0.08 dex
Rotational velocity (v sin i)	1.0 km/s

B
Mass	0.81 M_{☉}
Radius	0.86 R_{☉}
Luminosity	0.37 L_{☉}
Surface gravity (log g)	4.49 cgs
Temperature	4.866 K
Metallicity [Fe/H]	−0.18 dex

Other designations
- T Cyg, AAVSO 2043+34, BD+33°4028, HD 198134, HIP 102571, HR 7956, SAO 70499, WDS J20472+3422AB

Database references
SIMBAD	data

T Cygni is a binary star system in the northern constellation of Cygnus. It is a faint system but visible to the naked eye with a combined apparent visual magnitude of 4.93. Based upon an annual Parallax shift of 7.8 mas, it is located about 414 light years away. It is moving closer to the Earth with a heliocentric radial velocity of −24 km/s.

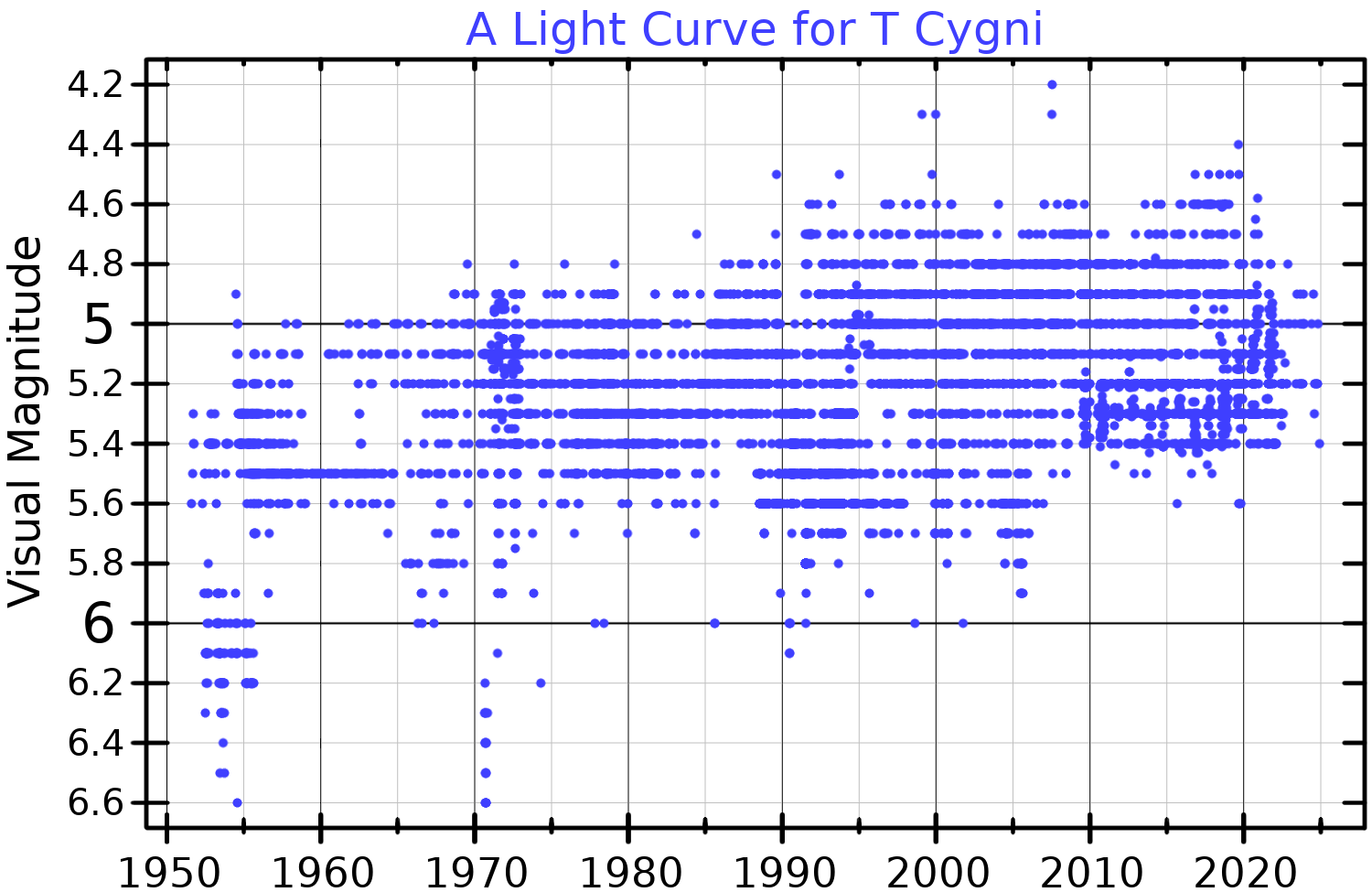
A visual band light curve for T Cygni, plotted from AAVSO data

The primary, component A, is a variable star, most likely of the slow irregular type, which ranges in magnitude from 4.91 down to 4.96. Johann Friedrich Julius Schmidt discovered that its brightness varies, in 1864. It appeared with its variable star designation in Annie Jump Cannon's 1907 work "Second Catalogue of Variable Stars". It is a giant star with a stellar classification of K3 III, which indicates it has exhausted the hydrogen at its core and evolved away from the main sequence. The star has expanded to 35 times the radius of the Sun. It is radiating 374 times the Sun's luminosity from its enlarged photosphere at an effective temperature of 4,423 K.

The secondary companion, component B, is a magnitude 10.03 star located at an angular separation of 8.10″ along a position angle of 120°, as of 2012. In 1877 it was separated by 10.0″ with nearly the same position angle (121°). Although no spectral class has been published, the secondary has been calculated to have a mass of 0.8 M_{☉}, an effective temperature of 4,866 K, a radius of 0.9 R_{☉}, and a bolometric luminosity of 0.4 L_{☉}.

Multiple star catalogs list an 11th magnitude star, component C, at a separation of 17″. It has a small parallax and is much further away than the binary pair.
