= Kepler-87 =

Star in Cygnus

Observation data Epoch J2000.0 Equinox ICRS
- Constellation: Cygnus
- Right ascension: 19^{h} 51^{m} 40.0490^{s}
- Declination: +46° 57′ 54.425″
- Apparent magnitude (V): 15

Characteristics
- Spectral type: G4IV
- Variable type: planetary transit

Astrometry
Proper motion (μ)	RA: −4.382(19) mas/yr Dec.: −0.821(20) mas/yr
Parallax (π)	0.7803±0.0154 mas
Distance	4,180 ± 80 ly (1,280 ± 30 pc)

Other designations
- KOI-1574, 2MASS J19514005+4657544, KIC 10028792, WISE J195140.04+465754.4

Database references
SIMBAD	data
Exoplanet Archive	data

Kepler-87 is a star slightly more massive than the Sun and it is nearing the end of its main-sequence period.

== Planetary system ==
Kepler-87 hosts four planets, two confirmed (Kepler-87b, Kepler-87c and two unconfirmed (Kepler-87d, Kepler-87e). It is the farthest system from the Sun with two unconfirmed planet candidates at 4021 light-years.

The Kepler-87 planetary system
Companion (in order from star)	Mass	Semimajor axis (AU)	Orbital period (days)	Eccentricity	Inclination (°)	Radius
b	1.02+0.16 −0.16 M_{J}	0.481+0.026 −0.028	114.73635+0.00015 −0.00015	0.036±0.009	—	—
c	0.02+0.003 −0.003 M_{J}	0.676+0.037 −0.04	191.2318+0.0015 −0.0015	0.039±0.012	—	—
d (unconfirmed)	—	0.0628	5.83393857±2.241	0	—	—
e (unconfirmed)	—	0.0836	8.9772888±0.0001451	0	—	—
