= V1334 Cygni =

Variable star in the constellation Cygnus

- Location of V1334 Cygni (circled)

Observation data Epoch J2000 Equinox ICRS
- Constellation: Cygnus
- Right ascension: 21^{h} 19^{m} 22.17915^{s}
- Declination: +38° 14′ 14.8688″
- Apparent magnitude (V): 5.77 - 5.96

Characteristics
- Spectral type: F1II + B7.0V
- B−V color index: 0.50
- Variable type: δ Cepheid

Astrometry
Radial velocity (R_{v})	−2.65±0.01 km/s
Proper motion (μ)	RA: 2.293±0.065 mas/yr Dec.: 0.226±0.076 mas/yr
Parallax (π)	1.0831±0.0738 mas
Distance	2,350±25 ly (720.4±7.8 pc)
Absolute magnitude (M_{V})	−3.06

Orbit
Primary	Aa
Name	Ab
Period (P)	1932.8±1.8 d
Semi-major axis (a)	(8.54±0.04)×10^{−3}" (6.16±0.07 au)
Eccentricity (e)	0.233±0.001
Inclination (i)	124.94±0.09°
Longitude of the node (Ω)	229.8±0.3°
Periastron epoch (T)	2453316.75±4.1
Semi-amplitude (K_{1}) (primary)	14.168±0.014 km/s
Semi-amplitude (K_{2}) (secondary)	15.036±0.304 km/s

Details

Aa (Cepheid)
Mass	4.288±0.133 M_{☉}
Radius	40.6±3.0 R_{☉}

Ab
Mass	4.040±0.048 M_{☉}

Other designations
- HD 203156, ADS 14859 AB, BD+37 4271, HIP 105269, HR 8157, SAO 71203

Database references
SIMBAD	data

V1334 Cygni, also referred to as ADS 14859 and HR 8157 in astronomical literature, is a star about 2,350 light years from the Earth in the constellation Cygnus. It is a 6th-magnitude star, which will be faintly visible to the naked eye of an observer located far from city lights. It is a classical Cepheid variable star, ranging in brightness from magnitude 5.77 to 5.96 over a period of 3.332816 days.

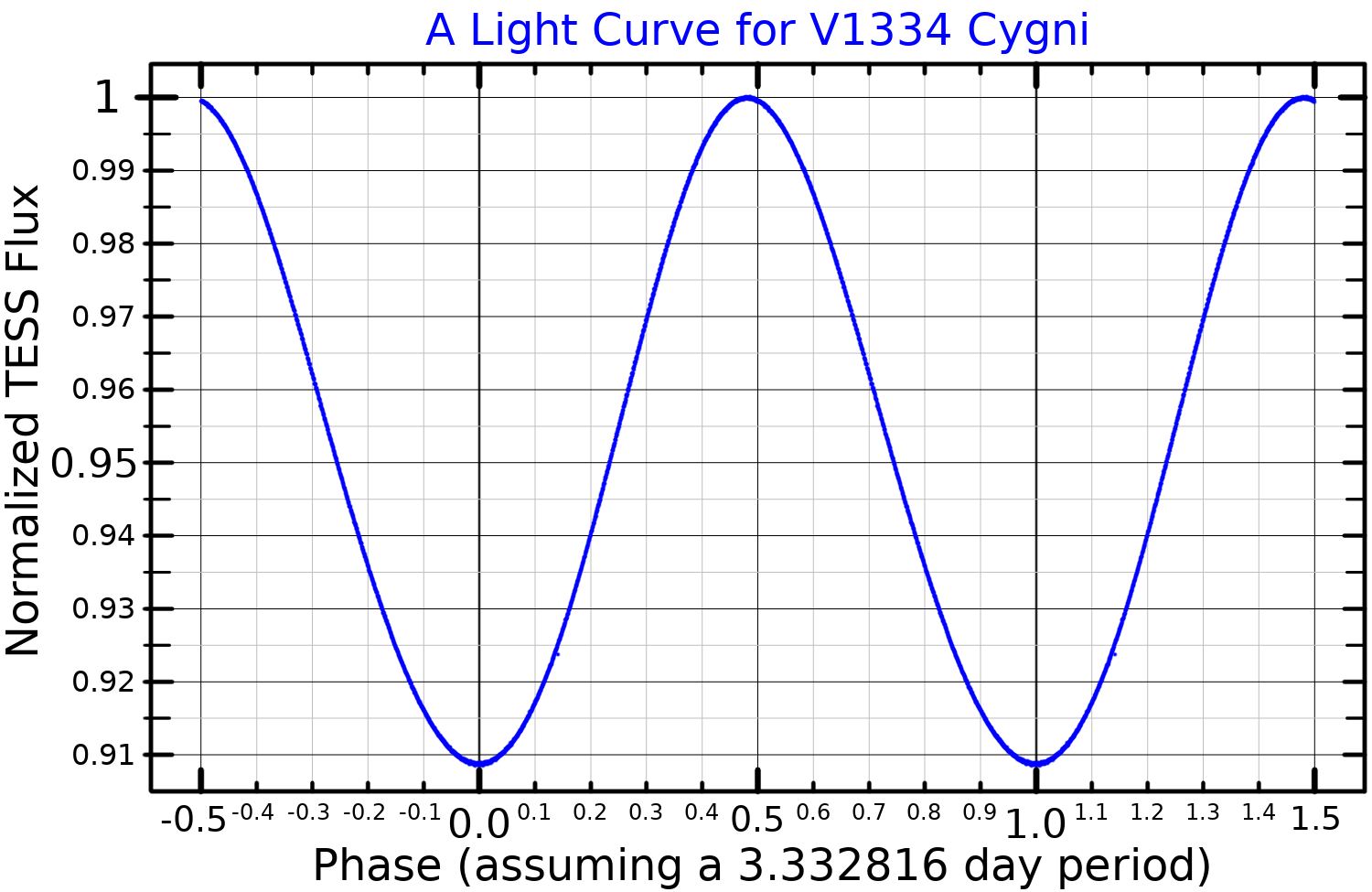
A light curve for V1334 Cygni, plotted from TESS data

V1334 Cygni is an important calibrator for models of Cepheid variables, because its presence in triple star system with a close binary pair has allowed its distance to be measured by orbital fitting with 1% accuracy. Gaia DR2 and DR3 notionally conflict with this value by over three standard deviations. However this is to be expected as these data releases ignore binarity. (Note: Gallenne et al 2018 quote 3.6σ and 3.2σ tension with DR2 before and after applying the basic systematic correction. The DR3 uncorrected tension is 4.0σ.) Gaia DR4 is expected to introduce corrections for multiplicity, orbital motion, and variability into Gaia's data reduction.

V1334 Cygni was discovered to be a double star in November of 1886, by George Hough using the 18.5 inch refractor at the old (Chicago) site of the Dearborn Observatory. It was given number 286 in his catalog. In the fall of 1966, V1334 Cygni was discovered to be a variable star accidentally, when Robert Mills used it as a presumed constant-brightness comparison star in a search for Cepheid variables. Follow-up observations by Mills in 1968 at Lowell Observatory found that the star showed "cepheid-like" brightness changes with a period of 3.335 days. It was given the variable star designation V1334 Cygni in 1970. In 2000, Nancy Evans deduced from radial velocity measurements that the star is actually a triple star system, with a close binary pair (containing the Cepheid variable) forming one "star" (component A) of the double star that had been identified more than a century earlier.

Attempts to identify component B (the companion star first seen by Hough in 1886) in the late 20th and early 21st centuries have been largely unsuccessful. This is surprising, because the speckle interferometry techniques employed by these later studies have far higher resolution than did Hough's refractor. But there are possible orbits for B which would be consistent with both a real 19th century detection and the non-detections a century later. There are doubts over whether a third star exists at all.
