= HR 7484 =

Star in the constellation Cygnus

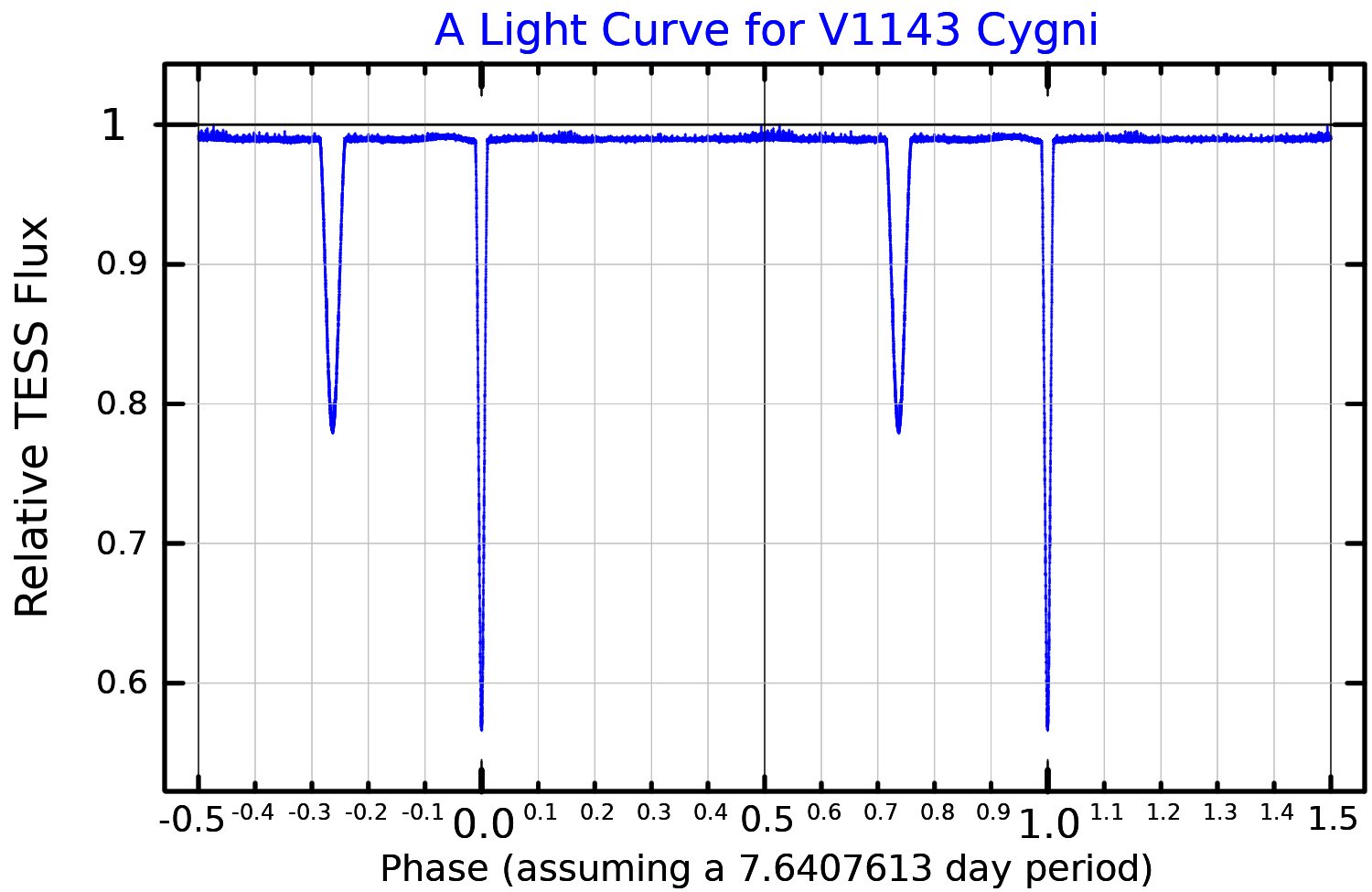
- A light curve for V1143 Cygni, plotted from TESS data

Observation data Epoch J2000 Equinox ICRS
- Constellation: Cygnus
- Right ascension: 19^{h} 38^{m} 41.18316^{s}
- Declination: +54° 58′ 25.6420″
- Apparent magnitude (V): 5.889±0.015, 6.37

Characteristics
- Spectral type: F6V (F5 V + F5 V)
- B−V color index: 0.482±0.004
- Variable type: Algol

Astrometry
Radial velocity (R_{v})	−13.9±0.2 km/s
Proper motion (μ)	RA: +34.885 mas/yr Dec.: +162.839 mas/yr
Parallax (π)	24.7090±0.0422 mas
Distance	133.79 ± 0.72 ly (41.02±0.22 pc)
Absolute magnitude (M_{V})	2.83

Orbit
Period (P)	7.640735±0.000004 d
Semi-major axis (a)	(2.57±0.03)×10^{−3}" (22.71±0.03 R_{☉})
Eccentricity (e)	0.5386±0.0004
Inclination (i)	86.73±0.76°
Longitude of the node (Ω)	50.9±0.6°
Periastron epoch (T)	2454598.1930±0.0008 HJD
Argument of periastron (ω) (secondary)	49.11±0.10°
Semi-amplitude (K_{1}) (primary)	88.15±0.06 km/s
Semi-amplitude (K_{2}) (secondary)	90.08±0.08 km/s

Details

A
Mass	1.361±0.004 M_{☉}
Radius	1.348±0.016 R_{☉}
Luminosity	3.35±0.44 L_{☉}
Surface gravity (log g)	4.31±0.03 cgs
Temperature	6,620±190 K
Metallicity [Fe/H]	+0.08 dex
Rotational velocity (v sin i)	19.1±0.6 km/s
Age	500 Myr

B
Mass	1.332±0.004 M_{☉}
Radius	1.322±0.016 R_{☉}
Luminosity	3.13±0.50 L_{☉}
Surface gravity (log g)	4.32±0.04 cgs
Temperature	6,570±220 K
Rotational velocity (v sin i)	27.9±1.2 km/s
Age	500 Myr

Other designations
- V1143 Cyg, HD 185912, HIP 96620, HR 7484, SAO 31850

Database references
SIMBAD	data

HR 7484 (V1143 Cyg) is a binary star system in the northern constellation of Cygnus. It is dimly visible to the naked eye under good viewing conditions, having an apparent visual magnitude of 5.89. Based upon dynamical parallax measurements, it is located 41.02 ± 0.22 parsecs (133.79 ± 0.72 light-years) away. The system is moving closer with a heliocentric radial velocity of −14 km/s.

== Observational history ==
Radial velocity measurements taken at the Dominion Astrophysical Observatory in Victoria, British Columbia Canada in 1919 led to the determination by William Edmund Harper that HR 7484 is a double-lined spectroscopic binary. The next year he published an orbit with a period of 7.6383 days as compared to the modern value of 7.640735 days.

== Physical characteristics ==
HR 7484 is a detached eclipsing binary, which means the orbital plane is aligned close to the line-of-sight from the Earth, causing the components to eclipse twice per orbit. The system is undergoing apsidal motion, with a rate greater than that predicted by general relativity. Both components are ordinary F-type main-sequence stars with similar physical properties. The star normally has an apparent magnitude of 5.89, but every 7.64 days (7 days, 15 hours, and 22 minutes) its brightness decreases to magnitude 6.37, approximately two thirds as bright. Five days and 17 hours after each primary eclipse, there is a secondary eclipse when the brightness drops to magnitude 6.06, about 85% of the normal brightness. Each eclipse lasts for 220 minutes. Both eclipses are partial.
