= 9 Cygni =

Star in the constellation Cygnus

Observation data Epoch J2000 Equinox ICRS
- Constellation: Cygnus
- Right ascension: 19^{h} 34^{m} 50.9285^{s}
- Declination: +29° 27′ 46.697″
- Apparent magnitude (V): 5.39 (5.9 + 6.4)

Characteristics
- Evolutionary stage: Red clump + main sequence
- Spectral type: G8 IIIa + A2 V
- B−V color index: 0.581

Astrometry
Radial velocity (R_{v})	20.09±1.98 km/s
Proper motion (μ)	RA: +14.822 mas/yr Dec.: +13.554 mas/yr
Parallax (π)	5.4904±0.0892 mas
Distance	594 ± 10 ly (182 ± 3 pc)
Absolute magnitude (M_{V})	−0.70

Orbit
Period (P)	4.56 yr
Semi-major axis (a)	0.030″
Eccentricity (e)	0.82
Inclination (i)	114.6°
Longitude of the node (Ω)	29.3°
Periastron epoch (T)	1985.56
Argument of periastron (ω) (secondary)	45.5°

Details

9 Cyg A
Mass	2.9±0.4 M_{☉}
Radius	18.2 R_{☉}
Surface gravity (log g)	3.040±0.370 cgs
Temperature	5,047 K
Metallicity [Fe/H]	−0.260±0.090 dex

9 Cyg B
Mass	2.7±0.4 M_{☉}
Radius	3.5 R_{☉}
Temperature	9,247 K
Age	437.1 Myr

Other designations
- BD+29 3651, HIP 96302, HR 7441, SAO 87385
- 9 Cyg A: HD 184759
- 9 Cyg B: HD 184760

Database references
SIMBAD	data

9 Cygni is a binary star system in the northern constellation of Cygnus. 9 Cygni is its Flamsteed designation. The two stars have a combined magnitude of 5.39, so it can be seen with the naked eye under good viewing conditions. Parallax measurements made by Gaia put the star at a distance of around 590 light-years (182 parsecs) away.

The two stars of 9 Cygni are a G-type giant and an A-type star. Both stars are over twice as massive as the Sun. They orbit once every 4.56 years, separated with a semi-major axis of 0.030 arcseconds. However, the eccentricity is high, at 0.82. The primary is a red clump giant, a star on the cool end of the horizontal branch fusing helium in its core. The secondary star has begun to evolve off the main sequence; it is sometimes classified as a giant star and sometimes as a main-sequence star.

== See also ==
- Spectroscopic binary
