= Kepler-63 =

Star in the constellation Cygnus

Observation data Epoch J2000 Equinox ICRS
- Constellation: Cygnus
- Right ascension: 19^{h} 16^{m} 54.2861^{s}
- Declination: 49° 32′ 53.451″
- Apparent magnitude (V): 12.02

Characteristics
- Evolutionary stage: Main sequence
- Spectral type: G2V

Astrometry
Radial velocity (R_{v})	−21.7±0.8 km/s
Proper motion (μ)	RA: 14.375 mas/yr Dec.: 23.336 mas/yr
Parallax (π)	5.1157±0.0096 mas
Distance	638 ± 1 ly (195.5 ± 0.4 pc)

Details
Mass	0.984^{+0.035}_{−0.040} M_{☉}
Radius	0.901^{+0.027}_{−0.021} R_{☉}
Luminosity	0.696^{+0.076}_{−0.059} L_{☉}
Surface gravity (log g)	4.52±0.02 cgs
Temperature	5576±50 K
Metallicity [Fe/H]	0.05±0.08 dex
Rotation	5.4±0.009 days
Rotational velocity (v sin i)	5.6±0.8 km/s
Age	0.21±0.045 Gyr

Other designations
- KOI-63, TYC 3550-458-1, 2MASS J19165428+4932535

Database references
SIMBAD	data

Kepler-63 is a G-type main-sequence star about 638 light-years away. The star is much younger than the Sun, at 0.21 billion years. Kepler-63 is similar to the Sun in its concentration of heavy elements.

The star is exhibiting strong starspot activity, with relatively cold (4700±300 K) starspots concentrated in two mid-latitude bands similar to the Sun, changing their position in a cycle with a period of 1.27±0.16 years. Due to high magnetic activity associated with its young age, Kepler-63 has a very hot corona heated to 8 million degrees, and produces over ten times the solar amount of x-rays than the Sun.

Multiplicity surveys did not detect any stellar companions to Kepler-63 by 2016.

== Planetary system ==
In 2013 a transiting hot Jupiter planet b was detected on a tight orbit. The orbit is nearly polar to the equatorial plane of the star.

The Kepler-63 planetary system
Companion (in order from star)	Mass	Semimajor axis (AU)	Orbital period (days)	Eccentricity	Inclination (°)	Radius
b	< 0.377 M_{J}	0.080±0.002	9.4341505±0.000001	<0.45	87.806^{+0.018}_{−0.019}	0.54±0.02 R_{J}
