= Kepler-48 =

Star in the constellation Cygnus

Observation data Epoch J2000 Equinox ICRS
- Constellation: Cygnus
- Right ascension: 19^{h} 56^{m} 33.416^{s}
- Declination: +40° 56′ 56.50″
- Apparent magnitude (V): 13.174±0.103

Characteristics
- Evolutionary stage: subgiant
- Spectral type: K0V

Astrometry
Radial velocity (R_{v})	−13.34±2.12 km/s
Proper motion (μ)	RA: 13.215(12) mas/yr Dec.: −20.410(15) mas/yr
Parallax (π)	3.2283±0.0116 mas
Distance	1,010 ± 4 ly (310 ± 1 pc)

Details
Mass	0.916 M_{☉}
Radius	0.897 R_{☉}
Luminosity	0.5137 L_{☉}
Surface gravity (log g)	4.47363 cgs
Temperature	5,160 K
Metallicity [Fe/H]	0.2±0.1 dex
Rotational velocity (v sin i)	0.5 km/s
Age	3.14 Gyr

Other designations
- Kepler-48, KOI-148, KIC 5735762, 2MASS J19563341+4056564

Database references
SIMBAD	data
Exoplanet Archive	data
KIC	data

Kepler-48, previously designated KOI-148, is a subgiant star in the constellation of Cygnus, about 1,000 light years away.

== Planetary System ==
Kepler-48 has five confirmed exoplanets.

The Kepler-48 planetary system
Companion (in order from star)	Mass	Semimajor axis (AU)	Orbital period (days)	Eccentricity	Inclination (°)	Radius
b	3.94±2.1 M_{🜨}	0.054	4.77800	—	—	1.85±0.09 R_{🜨}
c	14.61±2.3 M_{🜨}	0.086	9.67395	—	—	2.56±0.07 R_{🜨}
d	7.93±4.6 M_{🜨}	0.23	42.8961	—	—	1.98±0.07 R_{🜨}
e	657±25 M_{🜨}	1.9	982±8	0.003±0.028	—	—
f	≥0.93±0.29 M_{J}	5.7	5205	0.01±0.15	—	—
