= HD 203857 =

Double star in the constellation Cygnus

Observation data Epoch J2000.0 Equinox ICRS
- Constellation: Cygnus
- Right ascension: 21^{h} 23^{m} 48.38841^{s}
- Declination: +37° 21′ 05.3216″
- Apparent magnitude (V): 6.46

Characteristics
- Evolutionary stage: red giant branch
- Spectral type: K5
- B−V color index: 1.472±0.006

Astrometry
| Radial velocity (R_{v}) | −6.26±0.16 km/s |
| Proper motion (μ) | RA: −5.825 mas/yr Dec.: −8.629 mas/yr |
| Parallax (π) | 2.6676±0.0184 mas |
| Distance | 1,223 ± 8 ly (375 ± 3 pc) |
| Absolute magnitude (M_{V}) | −0.75 |

Details
| Mass | 1.7 M_{☉} |
| Radius | 46-50 R_{☉} |
| Luminosity | 513 L_{☉} |
| Temperature | 4,080 K |

Other designations
- BD+36°4543, HD 203857, HIP 105637, HR 8193, SAO 71280, CCDM J21237+3722A

Database references
| SIMBAD | data |

HD 203857 is a double star in the constellation Cygnus. It is near the lower limit of visibility to the naked eye, having a combined apparent visual magnitude of 6.46. The distance to the primary component is approximately 1,223 light years based on parallax, and it has an absolute magnitude of −0.75. The star is drifting closer to the Sun with a radial velocity of −6.3 km/s. It has a stellar classification of K5 and is known to be evolved. The star likely hosts an extrasolar planet, though not yet confirmed.

HD 203857 is listed in the Washington Double Star Catalogue as having five visual companions. It is separated by six arc-minutes from HD 203784, an F-type subgiant, though it is likely they are actually not gravitationally–bound. HD 203784 is thought to be closer to us and less luminous than HD 203857. There are also fainter stars at 23″ and 178″. HD 203784 has a 13th-magnitude star and a 14th-magnitude star within 20″.

== Substellar companion ==
Okayama Planet Search team has published a paper in late 2008 reporting investigations on radial velocity variations observed for a set of evolved stars, announcing possible detection of a substellar companion orbiting the giant star HD 203857. Orbital period is estimated 2.3 years, but planet has still to be confirmed.

The HD 203857 planetary system
| Companion (in order from star) | Mass | Semimajor axis (AU) | Orbital period (days) | Eccentricity | Inclination (°) | Radius |
|---|---|---|---|---|---|---|
| b (unconfirmed) | ≥8.1 M_{J} | 2.1 | 836.8 | 0.3 | — | — |
