= Kepler-44 =

Star in the constellation Cygnus

Observation data Epoch J2000 Equinox ICRS
- Constellation: Cygnus
- Right ascension: 20^{h} 00^{m} 24.5657^{s}
- Declination: +45° 45′ 43.763″
- Apparent magnitude (V): 15.0

Characteristics
- Evolutionary stage: subgiant
- Spectral type: G0V~G0IV

Astrometry
Proper motion (μ)	RA: −0.956(18) mas/yr Dec.: +8.241(19) mas/yr
Parallax (π)	0.8719±0.0163 mas
Distance	3,740 ± 70 ly (1,150 ± 20 pc)

Details
Mass	1.19±0.10 M_{☉}
Radius	1.52±0.09 R_{☉}
Luminosity	2.28 L_{☉}
Temperature	5,757±134 K
Metallicity [Fe/H]	0.26±0.10 dex
Rotation	44.68 days
Rotational velocity (v sin i)	5.5±1.5 km/s
Age	6.95 Gyr

Other designations
- KOI-204, KIC 9305831, 2MASS J20002456+4545437

Database references
SIMBAD	data
KIC	data

Kepler-44, formerly known as KOI-204, is a star in the northern constellation of Cygnus. With an apparent visual magnitude of 15.0 this star is too faint to be seen with the naked eye.

== Planetary system ==
The Kepler spacecraft detected a transiting planet candidate around this star that was confirmed by radial velocity measurements taken by the SOPHIE spectrograph mounted on the 1.93 m telescope at the Haute-Provence Observatory. The planet is likely to be tidally locked to the parent star. In 2015, the planetary nightside temperature was estimated to be equal to 2347^{+149}_{−280} K.

The Kepler-44 planetary system
Companion (in order from star)	Mass	Semimajor axis (AU)	Orbital period (days)	Eccentricity	Inclination (°)	Radius
b	1.02 M_{J}	0.0455	3.246774	—	—	13 R_{🜨}
