= V380 Cygni =

Variable star in the constellation Cygnus

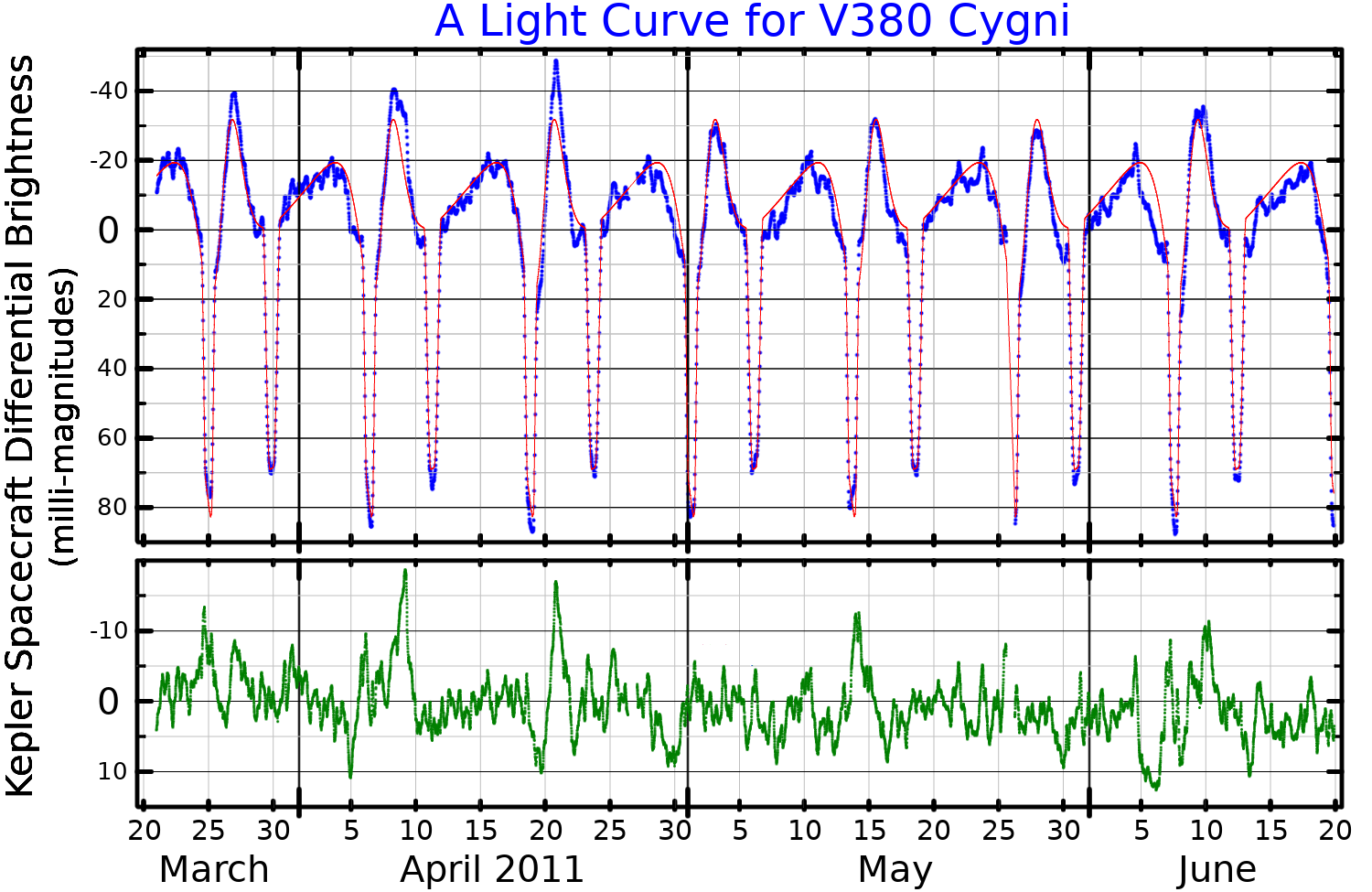
- A light curve for V380 Cygni, adapted from Tkachenko et al. (2012). The blue points in the upper panel show Kepler data. The red line shows a model for the light curve which assumes the two stars have no intrinsic variability. The bottom panel shows the Kepler data with the model subtracted, revealing the intrinsic variability.

Observation data Epoch J2000.0 Equinox J2000.0
- Constellation: Cassiopeia
- Right ascension: 19^{h} 50^{m} 37.32678^{s}
- Declination: +40° 35′ 59.1351″
- Apparent magnitude (V): 5.61 - 5.78

Characteristics
- Spectral type: B1.5 II-III(primary) + B2 V(secondary)
- Variable type: Algol / detached

Astrometry
Proper motion (μ)	RA: −3.125±0.055 mas/yr Dec.: −8.067±0.053 mas/yr
Parallax (π)	0.8673±0.0510 mas
Distance	3,800 ± 200 ly (1,150 ± 70 pc)

Orbit
Period (P)	12.425719±0.000014 d
Eccentricity (e)	0.234±0.006
Inclination (i)	82.4±0.02°
Semi-amplitude (K_{1}) (primary)	94.5±1.5 km/s
Semi-amplitude (K_{2}) (secondary)	151.1±3.0 km/s

Details

Primary
Mass	11.80±0.13 M_{☉}
Radius	16.00±0.13 R_{☉}
Luminosity	54,200±2,700 L_{☉}
Surface gravity (log g)	3.102±0.007 cgs
Temperature	21,500 K

Secondary
Mass	7.194±0.055 M_{☉}
Radius	3.904±0.067 R_{☉}
Luminosity	3,000±320 L_{☉}
Surface gravity (log g)	4.112±0.015 cgs
Temperature	22,000 K

Other designations
- HD 187879, BD+40 3902, HIP 97634, HR 7567, SAO 48892, Boss 5070

Database references
SIMBAD	data

V380 Cygni is an eclipsing binary star in the constellation Cygnus, located about 3,800 light years away from the Earth. Its apparent magnitude ranges from 5.61 to 5.78, making it faintly visible to the naked eye of an observer located far from city lights. Because it is an important test object for models of massive stars, it has been the subject of many scientific studies.

V380 Cygni was discovered to be a spectroscopic binary by Walter Sydney Adams, based on three spectra taken on separate nights in 1912 at the Mount Wilson Observatory. The binary's orbit was first calculated from spectra obtained in 1920 at the DDO; the period was found to be 12.427 days. Because the physical separation of spectroscopic binaries is often relatively small, they are good candidates to be eclipsing binaries. For that reason, in 1923 Joel Stebbins included V380 Cygni (then called Boss 5070) in an early photo-electric photometry study. A secondary eclipse was detected in June 1923 on the first night the star was observed.

V380 Cygni was observed several times at high cadence, for many days, by the Kepler space telescope. In addition to the brightness variations caused by eclipses, the Kepler data showed that the primary star has significant intrinsic variability which is most apt to be caused by gravity-mode oscillations.
