= V389 Cygni =

Variable star in the constellation Cygnus

- Location of V389 Cygni (circled)

Observation data Epoch J2000.0 Equinox ICRS
- Constellation: Cygnus
- A
- Right ascension: 21^{h} 08^{m} 38.88974^{s}
- Declination: +30° 12′ 20.2879″
- Apparent magnitude (V): 5.55 to 5.71
- B
- Right ascension: 21^{h} 08^{m} 38.67181^{s}
- Declination: +30° 12′ 22.2133″
- Apparent magnitude (V): 8.060

Characteristics

A
- Evolutionary stage: main sequence
- Spectral type: B9VspSi
- Variable type: Slowly pulsating B

B
- Spectral type: kA2.5hA7VmA9n

Astrometry

A
Proper motion (μ)	RA: +24.645 mas/yr Dec.: −20.647 mas/yr
Parallax (π)	8.1988±0.1038 mas
Distance	398 ± 5 ly (122 ± 2 pc)

B
Proper motion (μ)	RA: +24.004 mas/yr Dec.: −25.161 mas/yr
Parallax (π)	8.4500±0.0263 mas
Distance	386 ± 1 ly (118.3 ± 0.4 pc)

Orbit
Primary	Aa1
Name	Aa2
Period (P)	3.313 d
Eccentricity (e)	0
Semi-amplitude (K_{1}) (primary)	21.77 km/s

Orbit
Primary	Aa
Name	Ab
Period (P)	154.072 d
Eccentricity (e)	0.311
Semi-amplitude (K_{1}) (primary)	9.49 km/s

Details

Aa1
Mass	3.17 M_{☉}
Radius	2.5 R_{☉}
Luminosity	113 L_{☉}
Surface gravity (log g)	4.14 cgs
Temperature	11,885 K
Rotation	1.13 d
Rotational velocity (v sin i)	17.9 km/s

Aa2
Mass	0.40 M_{☉}

Ab
Mass	0.65 M_{☉}

B
Mass	1.54 M_{☉}
Radius	1.5 R_{☉}
Luminosity	6.2 L_{☉}
Surface gravity (log g)	4.33 cgs
Temperature	7,482 K
Rotational velocity (v sin i)	77 km/s

Other designations
- HD 201433, BD+29 4324, HIP 104371, HR 8094, SAO 70968, ADS 14682 AB Boss 5442, WDS 21086+3012AB

Database references
SIMBAD	data
- A
- B

V389 Cygni, also known as HD 201433 and HR 8094, is a multiple star system about 390 light years from the Earth, in the constellation Cygnus. It is visible as a 5th-magnitude star, making it faintly visible to the naked eye of an observer far from city lights. One component of that system is a slowly pulsating B-type star (SPB) causing the system's brightness to vary from magnitude 5.55 to 5.71 over a period of 1.4 days.

V389 Cygni is catalogued as a multiple star with four visible components. The faint companions TYC 2701-897-1 and UCAC4 602-123109 are unrelated background objects, at 59″ and 73″ respectively. A 5th-magnitude and 8th-magnitude star separated by 3.3″ form a common proper motion pair, generally referred to as components A and B). The brighter star, component A, is a spectroscopic binary and the system also harbours an unseen third star, making it a triple and the system as a whole then includes four stars. Both the visible stars are chemically peculiar, A being an Ap star and B an Am star. The blended spectral class of the pair is B9V, with the brighter star having a class of B9VspSi (or B9 Si Mg) and the fainter kA2.5hA7VmA9n.

Component A of V389 Cygni was discovered to be a spectroscopic binary from spectra obtained in 1918. In 1921, Reynold K. Young of the Dominion Astrophysical Observatory derived its orbit from 49 additional spectra obtained in 1920-1921. He found it to have a circular orbit, with a period of 3.3137 days. He noted that the star showed evidence of variability.

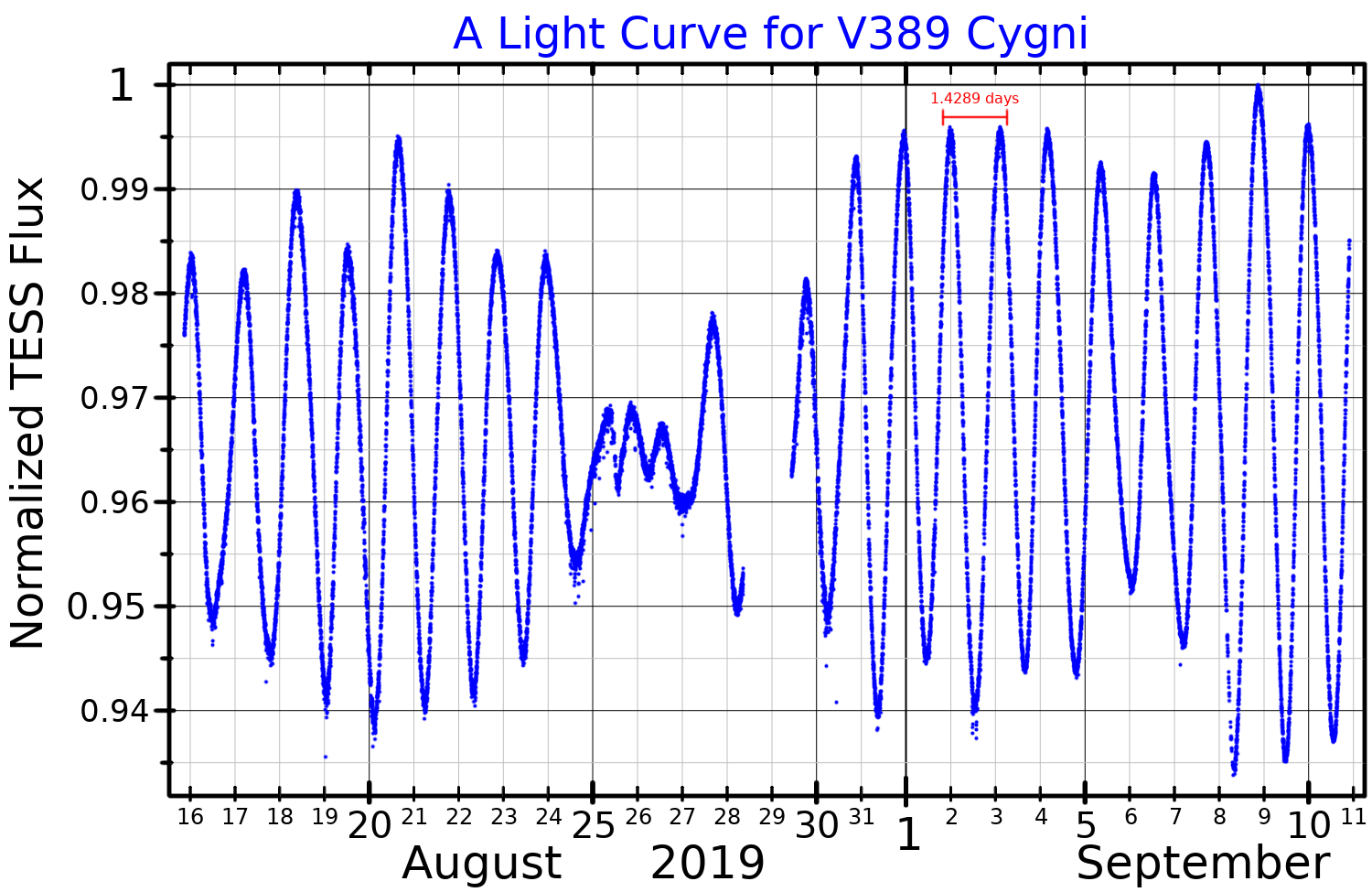
A light curve for V389 Cygni, plotted from TESS data. The 1.4289 day period is marked in red.

In 1922 Kurt Bottlinger and Paul Guthnick detected variability in V389 Cygni. Between 1936 and 1942, Guthnick made extensive photoelectric observations of V389 Cygni. He found that sometimes the brightness appeared to change irregularly, and at other times two periods, 1.12912 and 1.19328 days, could be seen. Neither period was related to the orbital period of the spectroscopic binary. Guthnick postulated that the system consisted of two Cepheid variables orbiting each other, but it is now believed that only one of the stars in the close binary pair is variable, and it is an SPB star.

In 1978, Frank Gieseking and Wilhelm Seggewiss refined Young's orbit determination for the spectroscopic binary (new period 3.313168±0.000008 days), and found that V389 Cygni is a triple star. The third, unseen component, orbits the close binary pair with a period of 154.09±0.02 days. They were unable to derive a nonzero eccentricity for either orbit. In 1989, David Barlow re-analyzed earlier data and found that while the orbit of the inner binary appeared to be circular, the data were best fit if the orbit of the third star had an eccentricity of 0.311±0.057.

In 2017, Thomas Kallinger et al. published an extensive spectroscopic and astroseismic study of V389 Cygni. They found 29 pulsation frequencies in the BRITE satellite data for the star. They were able to derive an eccentricity value for the inner binary pair's orbit of 0.015±0.003. Their astroseismic results indicate that the outer layer of the SPB star is in the process of becoming tidally locked to its close companion, but the inner portion of the star still rotates at a significantly different speed.
