= Kepler-46 =

Old star with a planetary system

- Artist's conception of the Kepler-46 system showing the two planets. Planet b transits its star, the same method by which it was detected.

Observation data Epoch J2000 Equinox J2000
- Constellation: Lyra
- Right ascension: 19^{h} 17^{m} 04.4930^{s}
- Declination: 42° 36′ 15.041″
- Apparent magnitude (V): 15.7

Characteristics
- Evolutionary stage: main sequence
- Spectral type: G
- Apparent magnitude (J): 13.814
- Apparent magnitude (H): 13.436
- Apparent magnitude (K): 13.347

Astrometry
| Proper motion (μ) | RA: 3.101(24) mas/yr Dec.: 0.864(27) mas/yr |
| Parallax (π) | 1.2963±0.0225 mas |
| Distance | 2,520 ± 40 ly (770 ± 10 pc) |

Details
| Mass | 0.902+0.040 −0.038 M_{☉} |
| Radius | 0.938+0.038 −0.039 R_{☉} |
| Luminosity | 0.43 L_{☉} |
| Surface gravity (log g) | 4.55 cgs |
| Temperature | 5155±150 K |
| Metallicity [Fe/H] | 0.41±0.10 dex |
| Rotation | 27.859±0.075 days |
| Age | 9.7+3.7 −3.5 Gyr |

Other designations
- Gaia DR2 2102700131386216576, KOI-872, KIC 7109675, 2MASS J19170449+4236150

Database references
| SIMBAD | data |
| Exoplanet Archive | data |
| KIC | data |

Kepler-46, previously designated KOI-872, is a star located in the constellation Lyra. Observed since 2009 by the Kepler space observatory, it has since been found to possess a planetary system consisting of at least three planets and while it has a similar mass to the Sun (90%) it is significantly older at ten billion years.

Kepler-46 b (previously KOI-872.01), was the first planet discovered in the system. It was found through detailed analysis of Kepler space observatory data. An additional planet, Kepler-46 c, was discovered by an outside group using Kepler public data through analysis of transit timing variations. While only one additional planet was confirmed by the analysis, the study revealed the potential existence of an unconfirmed planet KOI-872.03 (KOI-872 d). Validation by the multiplicity method confirmed the existence of this planet which was then renamed Kepler-46d.

== Planetary system ==
Planet b is a gas giant planet with a mass slightly less than that of Jupiter. The second planet in the system was among the first to be discovered through the method of transit timing variations, and through its confirmation of KOI-872 c with a 99% confidence level has shown that the method of detection may be used to detect future extrasolar planets and, possibly, extrasolar moons. This second planet exerted a gravitational force on the first planet, orbiting its host star in just 34 days. While this usually occurs on an extremely regular schedule, additional planets within the system can disrupt the time of the transit, and these disruptions can indicate the presence of a planet, even if the disrupting planet does not pass in front of the host star itself.

The data show that Kepler-46 c is an approximately Saturn-mass object with an orbital period of 57 days. As the planet does not itself transit its host star, there is no way of knowing its size (probably a similar size to its sibling). The measurements also suggest the existence of another planet orbiting with a period of about 6.8 days, and this planet was confirmed in 2016.

The method in which the planet was detected is similar to the way that the planet Neptune was discovered, in which the newly discovered planet is detected by its pull on another which is already known to exist.

In 2021, it was found the orbital plane of Kepler-46b is slowly changing, likely under the gravitational influence of the additional giant planet.

The Kepler-46 planetary system
| Companion (in order from star) | Mass | Semimajor axis (AU) | Orbital period (days) | Eccentricity | Inclination | Radius |
|---|---|---|---|---|---|---|
| d | 3.339 M_{🜨} | 0.0679±0.0035 | 6.76671+0.00013 −0.00012 | 0(assumed) | 88.55+0.49 −0.69° | 0.1510+0.0094 −0.0098 R_{J} |
| b | 0.885+0.374 −0.343 M_{J} | 0.1971±0.0001 | 33.648+0.004 −0.005 | 0.0321+0.0069 −0.0078 | 89.04±0.14° | 0.810+0.035 −0.36 R_{J} |
| c | 0.362±0.016 M_{J} | 0.2811±0.0003 | 57.325+0.116 −0.098 | 0.0354+0.0057 −0.0059 | 88.66+0.26 −0.27° | — |
