= Kepler-29 =

Sun-like star in the constellation Cygnus

Observation data Epoch J2000 Equinox ICRS
- Constellation: Cygnus
- Right ascension: 19^{h} 53^{m} 23.6018^{s}
- Declination: +47° 29′ 28.437″
- Apparent magnitude (V): 15.456±0.025

Characteristics
- Evolutionary stage: main sequence
- Spectral type: G5V

Astrometry
Proper motion (μ)	RA: 6.487(29) mas/yr Dec.: 16.183(24) mas/yr
Parallax (π)	1.1276±0.0229 mas
Distance	2,890 ± 60 ly (890 ± 20 pc)

Details
Mass	0.761+0.024 −0.028 M_{☉}
Radius	0.732+0.033 −0.031 R_{☉}
Luminosity	0.43 L_{☉}
Surface gravity (log g)	4.6±0.1 cgs
Temperature	5378±60 K
Metallicity [Fe/H]	−0.44±0.04 dex
Rotation	10.34 days
Rotational velocity (v sin i)	1.1 km/s
Age	7.1 Gyr

Other designations
- KOI-738, KIC 205071984, 2MASS J19532359+4729284, Gaia DR2 2086435189017387264

Database references
SIMBAD	data
KIC	data

Kepler-29 is a Sun-like star in the northern constellation of Cygnus. It is located at the celestial coordinates: Right Ascension 19^{h} 53^{m} 23.6018^{s}, Declination +47° 29′ 28.437″. With an apparent visual magnitude of 15.456, this star is too faint to be seen with the naked eye. It is a solar analog, having a close mass, radius, and temperature as the Sun. Currently the age of the star has not been determined due to its 2780 light-year (850 parsecs) distance. As of 2016 no Jovian exoplanets of 0.9–1.4 M_{J} have been found at a distance of 5 AU.

== Planetary system ==
In 2011 an analysis of the first four months of data from the Kepler space telescope detected 1235 planetary candidates two of which orbited this star. Later study of the transit-timing variations of the system lead to the confirmation of both planets. The planetary orbits are lying in Orbital resonance to each other, with orbital period ratio being exactly 7:9.

The Kepler-29 planetary system
Companion (in order from star)	Mass	Semimajor axis (AU)	Orbital period (days)	Eccentricity	Inclination (°)	Radius
b	5.0+1.5 −1.3 M_{🜨}	0.09	10.33966+0.00015 −0.00017	—	—	2.55±0.12 R_{🜨}
c	4.5±1.1 M_{🜨}	0.11	13.28633+0.00031 −0.00027	—	—	2.34+0.12 −0.11 R_{🜨}
