= Rho Cygni =

Star in the constellation Cygnus

- Location of ρ Cygni (circled)

Observation data Epoch J2000 Equinox ICRS
- Constellation: Cygnus
- Right ascension: 21^{h} 33^{m} 58.85298^{s}
- Declination: +45° 35′ 30.6179″
- Apparent magnitude (V): 4.02

Characteristics
- Evolutionary stage: horizontal branch
- Spectral type: G8 III Fe−0.5
- U−B color index: +0.56
- B−V color index: +0.89

Astrometry
Radial velocity (R_{v})	+6.88 km/s
Proper motion (μ)	RA: −23.79 mas/yr Dec.: −93.70 mas/yr
Parallax (π)	26.39±0.15 mas
Distance	123.6 ± 0.7 ly (37.9 ± 0.2 pc)
Absolute magnitude (M_{V})	1.11

Details
Mass	2.16 M_{☉}
Radius	8.19±0.15 R_{☉}
Luminosity	37.1 L_{☉}
Temperature	5,100 K
Metallicity [Fe/H]	−0.05 dex
Rotational velocity (v sin i)	0.71 km/s
Age	660 Myr

Other designations
- ρ Cyg, 73 Cygni, BD+44°3865, FK5 1568, GC 30207, HD 205435, HIP 106481, HR 8252, SAO 51035

Database references
SIMBAD	data

Rho Cygni is a yellow-hued star in the northern constellation of Cygnus. Its name is a Bayer designation that is Latinized from ρ Cygni and abbreviated Rho Cyg or ρ Cyg. This star is visible to the naked eye with an apparent visual magnitude of 4.02. The measured annual parallax shift is 26.39 mas, which yields a distance estimate of 124 light years. It is moving further from the Sun with a radial velocity of +6.88. The star is a member of the thin disk population of the Milky Way galaxy.

This is an evolved giant star of type G with an estimated age of 660 million years and a stellar classification of G8 III Fe-0.5. The suffix notation indicates the spectrum shows a mild underabundance of iron in the outer atmosphere. It has about 2.16 times the mass of the Sun and 7.81 times the Sun's girth. The star is radiating 37 times the Sun's luminosity from its enlarged photosphere at an effective temperature of 5,100 K.

Rho Cygni is a bright X-ray source with a luminosity of 10.26×10^{29} ergs s^{−1}. It has a maximum magnetic field strength of 7.3±0.5 G at the surface.
