= L Velorum =

The Bayer designations l Velorum and L Velorum are distinct. Due to technical limitations, both designations link here. For the star

- l Velorum, see HD 79917
- L Velorum, see HD 83058

== See also ==
- i Velorum
- I Velorum
- λ Velorum (Lambda Velorum)
- Liogluta velorum, species of beetle abbreviated as L. velorum
