= I Velorum =

The Bayer designations i Velorum and I Velorum are distinct. Due to technical limitations, both designations link here. For the star

- i Velorum, see HD 95370
- I Velorum, see HD 81848

== See also ==
- J Velorum (MV Velorum)
- l Velorum
