= PicSat =

French Nanosatellite

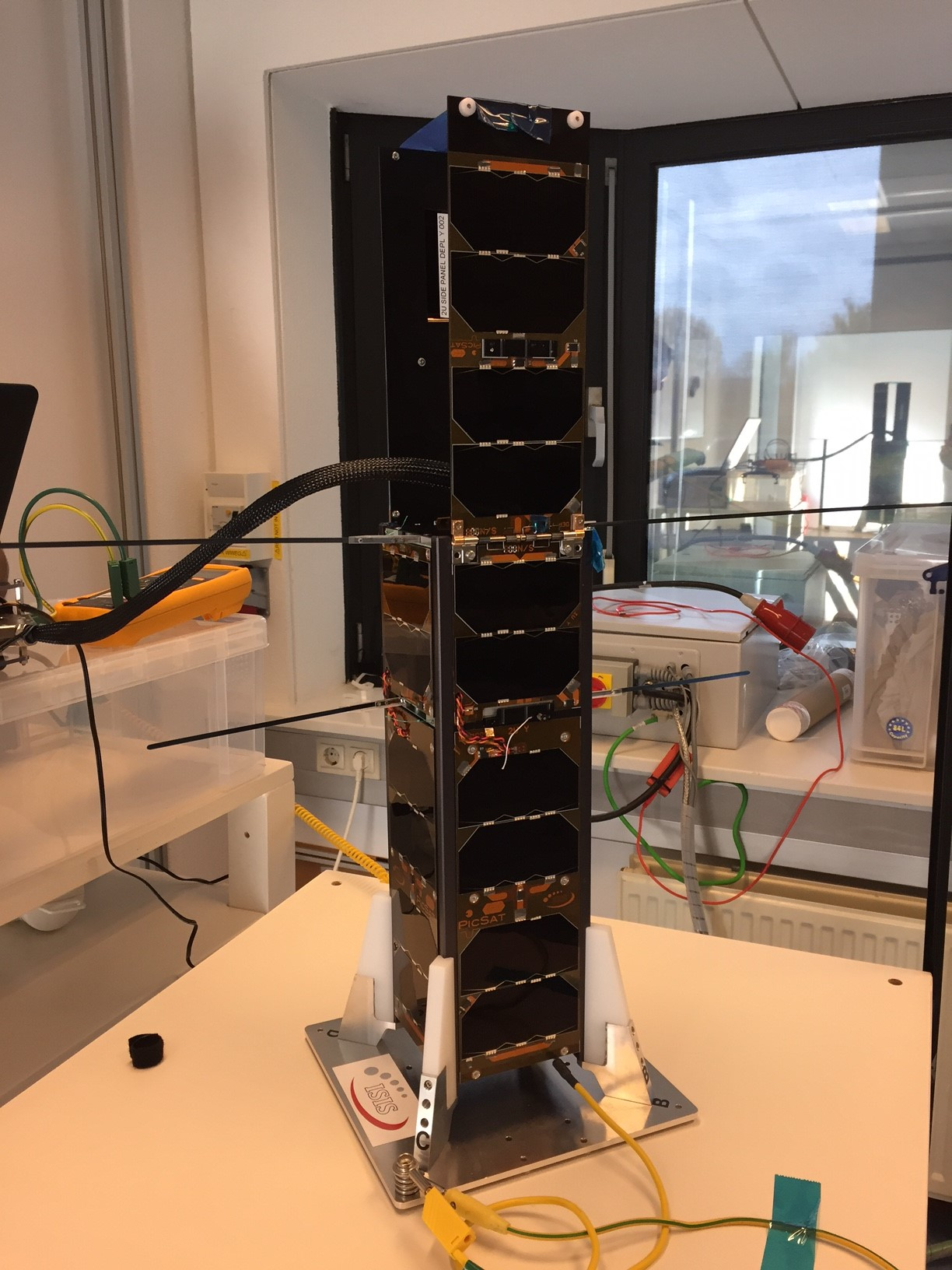
- Mission type: Astronomy · Planetary science
- Operator: Observatoire de Paris · CNRS
- COSPAR ID: 2018-004X
- SATCAT no.: 43132
- Website: http://picsat.obspm.fr
- Mission duration: ~1 year

Spacecraft properties
- Bus: CubeSat 3U
- Manufacturer: ISIS (spacecraft); Hyperion (ADCS); LESIA (payload)
- Launch mass: 3.9 kg
- Dimensions: 10 × 50 × 100 cm with antennas and solar panels
- Power: 6 watts

Start of mission
- Launch date: 12 January 2018, 03:58 UTC
- Rocket: PSLV
- Launch site: SDSC
- Contractor: ISL · ANTRIX

End of mission
- Last contact: 20 March 2018
- Decay date: 3 October 2023

Orbital parameters
- Reference system: Geocentric
- Regime: Low Earth · SSO
- Inclination: 97.3°
- Period: 95 minutes

Main telescope
- Type: Off-axis telescope
- Diameter: 50 mm
- Focal length: 150 mm
- Focal ratio: f/4
- Wavelengths: visible light

Transponders
- Band: VHF · UHF

PicSat was a French observatory nanosatellite, designed to measure the transit of Beta Pictoris b, an exoplanet which orbits the star Beta Pictoris.

PicSat was designed and built by a team of scientists led by Dr. Sylvestre Lacour, astrophysicist and instrumentalist at the High Angular Resolution in Astrophysics group in the LESIA laboratory with Paris Observatory, Paris Sciences et Lettres University and the French National Centre for Scientific Research (CNRS). It was launched on 12 January 2018, and operated for more than 10 weeks before falling silent on 20 March 2018. The CubeSat decayed from orbit on 3 October 2023.

== Background ==
=== Beta Pictoris system ===
With an age of about 23 million years, Beta Pictoris is a very young star. Compared to the Sun, which is 4.5 billion years old, Beta Pictoris is about twice as large in mass and size. Beta Pictoris is relatively close to the Sun: just 63.4 light-years away, making it bright and easy to observe. This makes Beta Pictoris interesting for study as it allows astronomers to learn more about the very early stages of planet formation.

In the early 1980s, a large disk of asteroids, dust, gas, and other debris were found surrounding Beta Pictoris, leftovers from the formation of the star. In 2009, a giant gas planet orbiting Beta Pictoris was discovered by a team of French astronomers led by Anne-Marie Lagrange from Grenoble, France. The planet, named Beta Pictoris b, is about seven times as massive as Jupiter. It orbits Beta Pictoris from a distance at around ten astronomical units: ten times the distance between the Earth and the Sun, and about the same distance between Saturn and the Sun.

In 2016, it was predicted that Beta Pictoris b's Hill sphere or the planet itself would be passing in front of its star as seen from the Earth. The detailed observation of such a transit would reveal detailed information about the planet, such as its exact size, the composition of its atmosphere, its density, and its chemical composition. Because Beta Pictoris b is so young, this information would reveal more about the formation of giant planets and planetary systems.

However, as Beta Pictoris b's orbit is not well known, the moment of transit could only be estimated roughly. The transit was predicted to occur between the summer of 2017 and the summer of 2018. A transit of the planet would have lasted only a few hours; a transit of the planet's Hill sphere would have lasted anywhere from days to months. Continuous monitoring would have been the only way to capture the phenomenon. Since Earth-based observatories would not be able to accurately capture the transit, as long-term continuous monitoring was unlikely to work with Earth's atmosphere, day-night cycle changes, and scheduling conflicts, only a satellite could accurately capture the transit.

The purpose of PicSat was to continually observe Beta Pictoris' brightness in order to capture the change in brightness when Beta Pictoris b transited over the star and partially blocked some light.

== Project ==
PicSat, a contraction of "Beta Pictoris" and "satellite", was a CubeSat. PicSat was composed of three standard cubic units, called a "3U", each 10x10x10cm in size.

PicSat was the first CubeSat to be operated by the CNRS. It was different from most CubeSat projects in that it was developed by professionals, not by students. The project began in 2014 when Sylvestre Lacour, astrophysicist and instrumentalist at the French CNRS at the LESIA laboratory / Paris Observatory, thought of using a CubeSat to observe Beta Pictoris b's transit. He gathered a small team and they designed and built PicSat.

PicSat was one of the few CubeSats worldwide with an astrophysical science goal and the first CubeSat in the field of exoplanetary science. The PicSat science case was defined in collaboration with Dr. Alain Lecavelier des Etangs from the Institut d’Astrophysique de Paris, who had been working on the Beta Pictoris system for many years. The PicSat project also involved a collaboration with CCERES, the "Center & Campus" space of PSL Research University, and with French Space Agency CNES experts.

== Specifications ==
PicSat consisted of three cubic units. The top and middle cubic units held the satellite's payload, and the bottom unit contained its onboard computer.

PicSat's topmost unit contained a small telescope with a five-centimeter diameter mirror. The mirror's small size was sufficient, as Beta Pictoris is very bright.

The middle unit contained two innovative technical tools: its fine-tracking ability, and its usage of a thin optical fiber, 3 micrometers in diameter. The fiber, whose usage marks the first time an optical fiber was flown into space, receives light photons and guides them to a sensitive photodiode that accurately measures the arrival time of each individual photon. Using a thin optical fiber eliminated other light sources, like stray light from the sky and scattered light from within the optical system, from entering the photodiode, allowing for accurate measurement of Beta Pictoris' brightness. A fast-moving piezoelectric actuator was added to PicSat to keep the optical fiber tracked upon Beta Pictoris, since the natural wobble of the satellite's orbit would affect the fiber's ability to accurately track and measure the star.

The bottom cubic unit of PicSat contained the onboard computer for the satellite's operation, ground-station communication with Earth, raw pointing of the telescope, battery operation, and other important monitoring tasks.

The whole satellite was clothed in arrays of deployable solar panels, providing energy for all systems. PicSat's total weight was about 3.5 kilograms, and its power consumption was about 5 watts.

=== Telescope support ===
If PicSat ever detected the onset of Beta Pictoris b's transit, or the transit of its Hill sphere, then a European Southern Observatory telescope would have been immediately put into action. This was thanks to an accepted proposal to ESO for an opportunity to observe time in support of the PicSat project, led by Dr. Flavien Kiefer from the Institut d'astrophysique de Paris. Dr. Kiefer was known for his work on the detection and observation of exocomets in star systems such as Beta Pictoris.

The telescope was equipped with the High Accuracy Radial Velocity Planet Searcher (HARPS) instrument. Together with PicSat measurements, HARPS transit data would have allowed for more accurate determinations of the orbit and size of the planet, along with the chemical make up of its atmosphere. If a comet were to have transited, HARPS would have been able to determine the chemical composition of the comet's atmosphere, which carries key information about the chemical composition of the star system as a whole and thus its formation and evolution.

== Operation ==
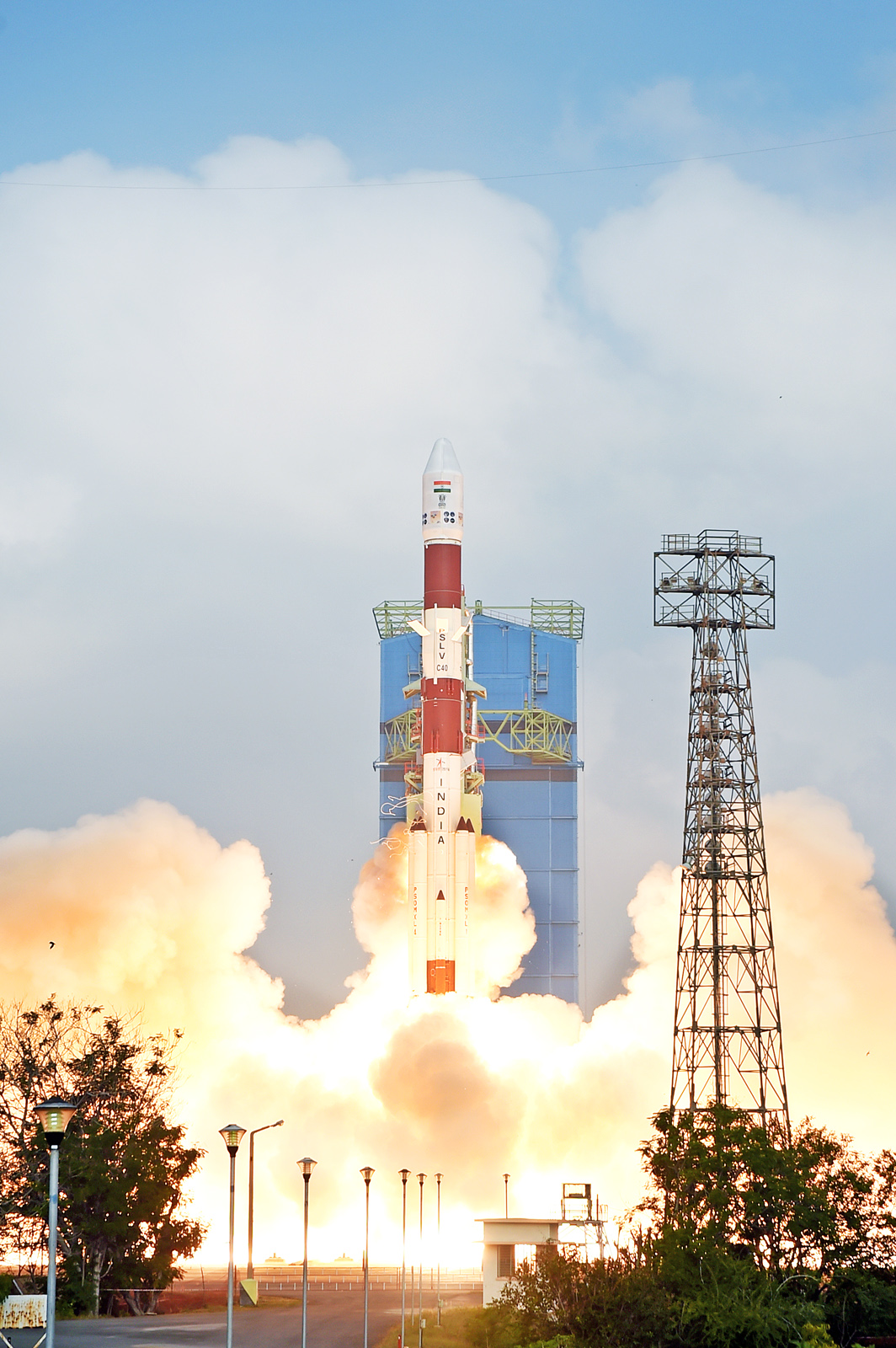
Launch of PSLV-C40 carrying PicSat

PicSat was launched into a polar, low Earth orbit with an altitude of 600 km on 12 January 2018. The launch was carried out by the Indian Space Research Organization using a Polar Satellite Launch Vehicle on the PSLV-C40 mission.

The satellite was operated from the PicSat Ground Station at Paris Observatory, although it only was visible for about 30 minutes a day. Since PicSat communicated with amateur radio frequencies (achieved with cooperation with Réseau des Émetteurs Français), anyone with radio receiving capabilities was able to tune into, receive, and upload information from PicSat to a database. A large network of radio amateurs were called to collaborate to track the satellite, receive its data, and transmit it to Ground Station. Licensed radio amateurs were able to use PicSat as a transponder when it was not performing observation tasks or other communication. PicSat's official website displayed received information, as well as up-to-date light curve data of Beta Pictoris.

PicSat was predicted to operate for one year. It operated for approximately 10 weeks before contact was lost on 20 March 2018. Attempts to reestablish contact were made. On 30 March it was believed contact was restored by a team at Morehead State University, but the signal received was from the TIGRISAT satellite. The mission officially concluded on 5 April.

== Supporting institutions ==
PicSat was financially supported by the European Research Council (ERC) under the European Union's Horizon 2020 research and innovation program Lithium proposal 639248, the CNRS, the ESEP Laboratory Group, the PSL Research University, Foundation MERAC, CNES, CCERES, and the Paris Observatory – LESIA.

== See also ==
- Methods of detecting exoplanets
- Photometry (astronomy)
