= Beta Pictoris c =

Super Jupiter exoplanet orbiting Beta Pictoris

Discovery
- Discovered by: A.-M. Lagrange et al.
- Discovery site: La Silla Observatory
- Discovery date: 19 August 2019
- Detection method: Radial velocity

Orbital characteristics
- Semi-major axis: 2.70±0.03 AU
- Eccentricity: 0.307+0.019 −0.025
- Orbital period (sidereal): 3.29+0.07 −0.03 yr
- Inclination: 88.93°+0.11° −0.09°
- Longitude of ascending node: 211.08°+0.05° −0.04°
- Time of periastron: 2019.490+0.018 −0.027
- Argument of periastron: −114.9°+2.6° −2.4°
- Semi-amplitude: 138+16 −15 m/s
- Star: Beta Pictoris

Physical characteristics
- Mean radius: 1.2±0.1 R_{J}
- Mass: 8.7+0.8 −0.7 M_{J}
- Temperature: 1250±50 K

Beta Pictoris c (abbreviated as β Pic c) is the second exoplanet discovered orbiting the young star Beta Pictoris, located approximately 63 light-years away from Earth in the constellation of Pictor. Its mass is around nine times that of Jupiter, and it orbits at around 2.7 astronomical units (AU) from Beta Pictoris, about 3.5 times closer to its parent star than Beta Pictoris b. It has an orbital period of 1,200 days (3.3 years). The orbit of Beta Pictoris c is moderately eccentric, with an eccentricity of ~0.31.

This exoplanet is notable for having been detected by three different methods: initially radial velocity, then direct imaging and astrometry.

== Physical characteristics ==
=== Mass and radius ===
Beta Pictoris c is a super-Jupiter, an exoplanet that has a radius and mass greater than that of the planet Jupiter. It has a mass of around 8.7 Jupiter masses (M_{J}) and a radius of about 1.2 times that of Jupiter.

=== Host star ===
The planet orbits an A-type main sequence star named Beta Pictoris. The star has a mass of 1.70 solar masses (M_{☉}) and a radius of 1.53 solar radii (R_{☉}). It has a surface temperature of 8054 K and is only 23 million years old. It has a near solar metallicity, with an metal-to-hydrogen ratio equivalent to 102% of that found in the Sun. Its luminosity (L_{☉}) is 7.2 times that of the Sun.

=== Orbit ===
Beta Pictoris c orbits at around 2.70 astronomical units (404 million kilometres) from Beta Pictoris, about 3.7 times closer than Beta Pictoris b and 9.6 times closer than Beta Pictoris d. It has an orbital period of 3.29 years (1,200 days). The planet spends most or all of its orbit in the habitable zone. As of 2026, the orbital parameters and mass of Beta Pictoris c have been measured using a combination of data from radial velocity, astrometry, and imaging.

== Discovery ==
Beta Pictoris c was detected indirectly, through 10 years of observation of radial velocity data from the High Accuracy Radial Velocity Planet Searcher (HARPS) spectroscope on the European Southern Observatory's ESO 3.6 m Telescope at La Silla Observatory in Chile by a worldwide team led by Anne-Marie Lagrange, as the discovery of the planet was publicly announced in August 2019. This discovery was described as being able to help scientists further understand the formation of planetary systems and their evolution in the early stages. In October 2020, new images of the exoplanet were revealed.

The European Southern Observatory confirmed the presence of Beta Pictoris c, on 6 October 2020, through the use of optical interferometry. With a semi-major axis of approximatively 2.7 astronomical units, Beta Pictoris c is, as of 2020, the closest extrasolar planet to its star ever photographed.
