= Serge Brunier =

French photographer, reporter and writer

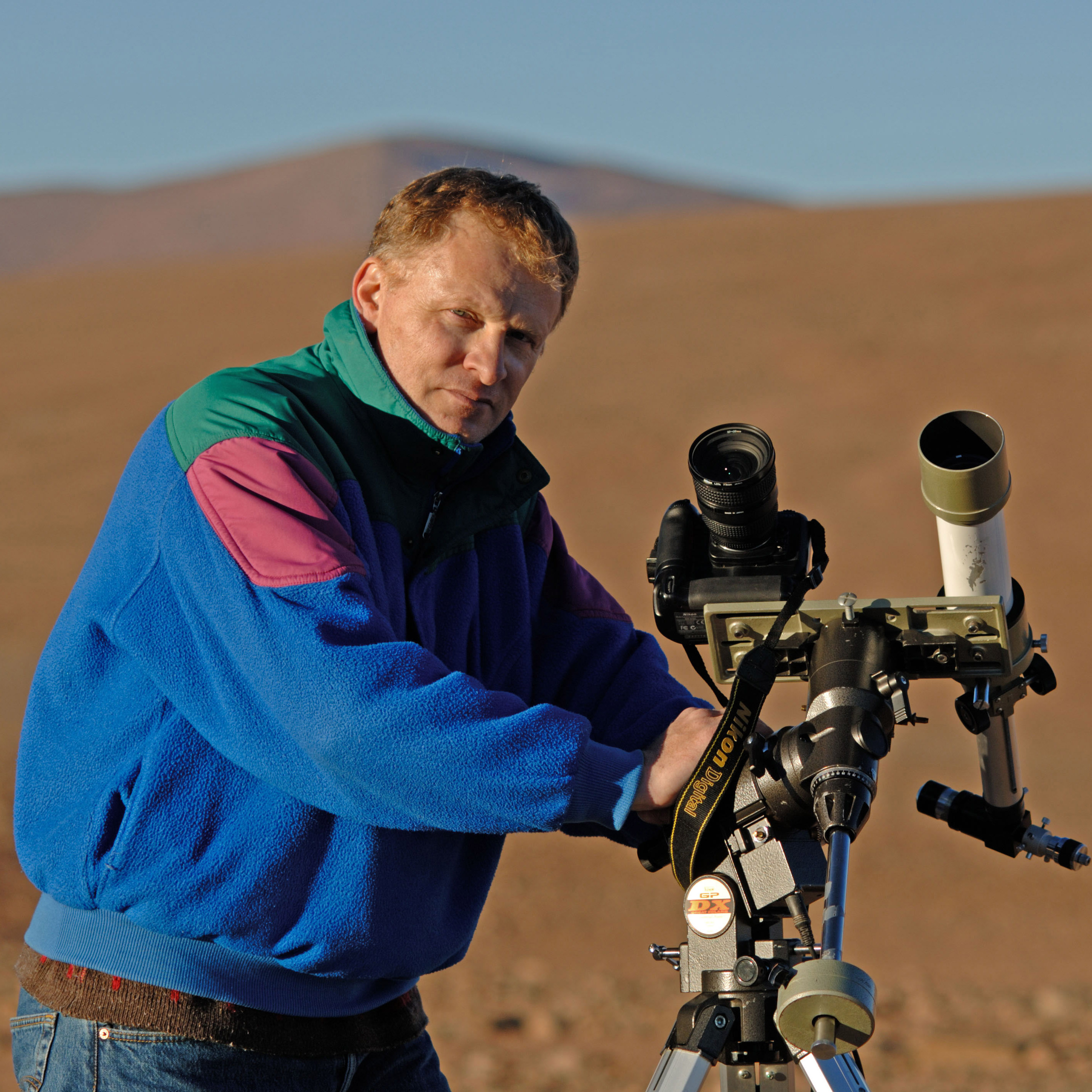
- Born: 1958 (age 67–68); Paris, France
- Occupations: Photographer, reporter, and writer

Serge Brunier (born 1958 in Paris) is a French photographer, reporter, and writer who has specialized in popular depictions of astronomical subjects.

== Work and Target ==
Brunier works together with the magazine Science et Vie and is a columnist of the radio station France Info. He has written a large number of illustrated works regarding astronomy.

He campaigns for an exploration of the Solar System through unmanned spacecraft, but fights against crewed spaceflight.

In his illustrated book Solar System Voyage, he describes the situations on the planets, and how a hypothetical voyager would experience them.

Brunier created a panoramic photograph of the Milky Way in the Atacama desert over two years; it was shown at his first exposition in the Monte Carlo Casino in 2006, and in 2007 at the Palais de la Découverte in Paris with its one hundred million pixels fit onto 144 square meters.

The International Astronomical Union has named the asteroid 10943 after Brunier in recognition of his services in the advancement of science.

=== The Concise Atlas of the Stars ===
Published in 2005 at Firefly Books Ltd., Brunier's Concise Atlas of the Stars helps to identify specific stars, nebulas, and galaxies by large photographs and transparent overlays, in particular of the most important constellations. It informs about location, luminosity, and dimensions as well as about when a specific object of the night sky can best be observed.

== Decorations ==
- 1986 Prix Montyon (for Architecture de l'Univers)
- 1994 Henri Rey Prize (through the Societé Astronomique de France)
- 1997 French prize for the best astronomical book of the year
- 2007 French prize for the best astronomical book of the year

== Works ==
- Nébuleuses et galaxies, atlas du ciel profond. Dunod, 1981
- Les Planètes. Bordas, Paris 1982 (with André de Cayeux)
- Architecture de l'Univers. Bordas, Paris 1985
- Astronomie du ciel profond. Dunod, 1988
- Éclipses – Les rendez-vous célestes. Bordas, Paris 1999 (with Jean-Pierre Luminet)
- Voyage dans le système solaire. Bordas, Paris 2000
- Le grand atlas des étoiles. Bordas, Paris 2001
- Les grands observatoires du monde. Bordas, Paris 2002 (with Anne-Marie Lagrange)
- Le grand atlas de la Lune. Éditions Larousse, Paris 2004 (with Thierry Legault)
- Atacama – Désert d'altitude. Nathan, Paris 2004
- Observer Mars. Éditions Larousse, Paris 2005
- Impasse de l'espace – À quoi servent les astronautes. Éditions du Seuil, 2006
- Voyage dans l'infini du ciel étoilé. Nathan, Paris 2006

=== In English ===
- Solar System Voyage. Cambridge University Press
- The Great Atlas of the Stars. (2001)
- The Concise Atlas of the Stars. (2005)
- New Atlas of the Moon. (with Thierry Legault)
- Great Observatories of the World. (with Anne-Marie Lagrange)
- Glorious Eclipses: Their Past, Present, and Future. Cambridge University Press (with Jean-Pierre Luminet, Storm Dunlop)
- Space Odyssey. The First Forty Years of Space Exploration.
- Majestic Universe. Views from Here to Infinity. Cambridge University Press
