= Thierry Legault =

French astronomer

Thierry Legault (born 1962) is a French amateur astronomer, specializing in astrophotography.

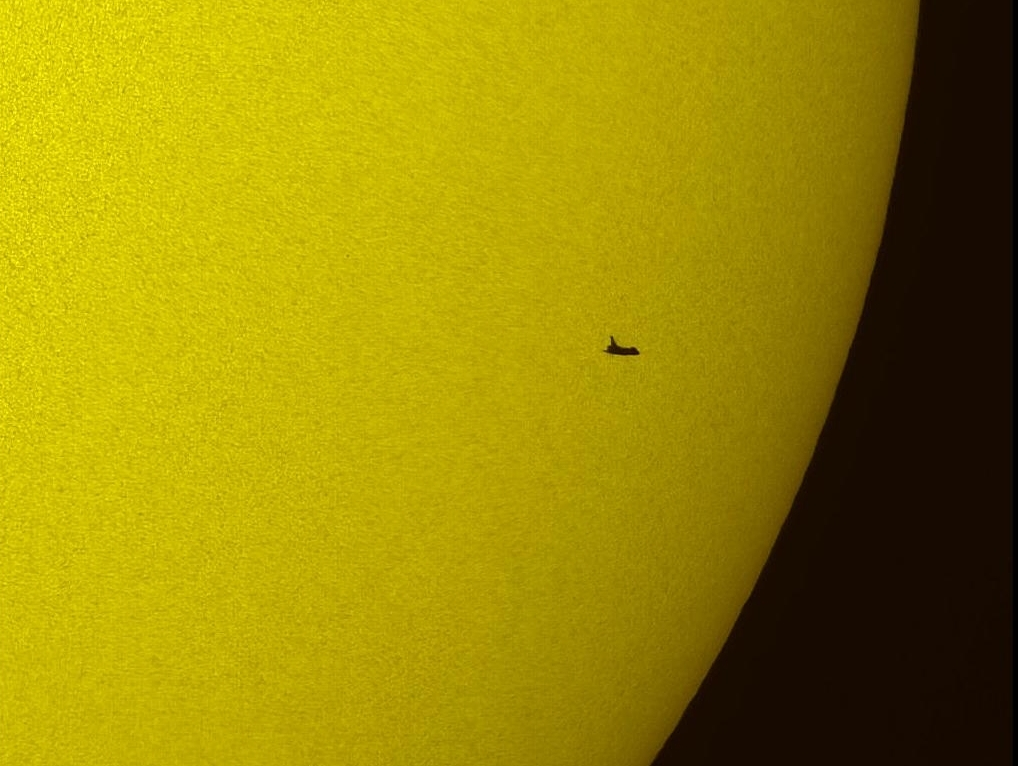
Transit of Space Shuttle Atlantis by Thierry Legault

An engineer by trade, he started astrophotography in 1993 and resorted to CCD cameras to photograph the deep sky. He then joined the Association des utilisateurs de détecteurs electroniques (l'AUDE), which aims to develop astronomical observation based on electronic detectors. In 1994, along with Christian Buil, he participated in a mission at the Pic du Midi Observatory on the collision of comet Shoemaker-Levy 9 with Jupiter and launched himself into planetary photography. He is the first amateur to have shown on his photographs the division of Encke on the rings of Saturn.

His photographs of the deep sky, the planets, the Moon and the Sun (eclipses and HA images) are published in numerous astronomical journals. Its image of the solar transit of the International Space Station (ISS) and the Space Shuttle Atlantis was presented on CNN in the introduction of the weather report of Femi Oke of October 6, 2006. He photographed the transit of the Space Shuttle Atlantis with the Hubble Space Telescope during its service mission in May 2009. He photographed the transit of the International Space Station in front of the sun during the partial eclipse of January 4, 2011. On June 6, 2012, during the transit of Venus, he traveled to Australia to photograph Venus and the Hubble Space Telescope in front of the Sun.

The International Astronomical Union gave its name to (19458 Legault) (1998 HE8), an asteroid of the main belt discovered in 1998 by Michel Bœuf. In 1999, the Société astronomique de France awarded him the Marius Jacquemetton Prize, which rewards "a remarkable astronomical work in the field of popularization as well as in the practice of amateur astronomy".

He published Le grand atlas de la Lune (The Grand Atlas of the Moon) with Serge Brunier at Éditions Larousse in 2004 and in 2006, Astrophotography, which received the Special Jury Prize of the Festival d'astronomie de Haute-Maurienne 2007.
