= Beta Pictoris b =

Super Jupiter orbiting Beta Pictoris

- The motion of Beta Pictoris b. The orbital plane is viewed side-on; the planet is not moving towards the star.

Discovery
- Discovered by: A.-M. Lagrange et al.
- Discovery site: Very Large Telescope
- Discovery date: November 18, 2008
- Detection method: Direct imaging

Orbital characteristics
- Semi-major axis: 10.07±0.03 AU
- Eccentricity: 0.105+0.004 −0.003
- Orbital period (sidereal): 23.77+0.15 −0.16 years
- Inclination: 88.993°+0.010° −0.011°
- Longitude of ascending node: 211.787°+0.010° −0.008°
- Time of periastron: 1990.27±0.04
- Argument of periastron: 23.7°+3.1° −2.6°
- Semi-amplitude: 79+16 −14 m/s
- Star: Beta Pictoris

Physical characteristics
- Mean radius: 1.37±0.02 R_{J} 1.680±0.003 R_{J}
- Mass: 11.90+2.93 −3.04 M_{J}
- Surface gravity: 3.59±0.05 cgs 3.86±0.02 cgs
- Synodic rotation period: 9.00±0.13 hours
- Equatorial rotation velocity: 16.1+0.9 −0.6 km/s
- Temperature: 1629+30 −38 K (1,356 °C; 2,473 °F)

Atmosphere
- Composition by volume: CO and H_{2}O, with tentative signs of CH_{4} and NH_{3}

Beta Pictoris b (abbreviated as β Pic b) is an exoplanet orbiting the young debris disk, A-type main sequence star, Beta Pictoris located approximately 63 light-years (19.4 parsecs, or 6×10^{14} km) away from Earth in the constellation of Pictor. It has a mass of around 10 Jupiter masses and a radius some 37% to 68% larger than Jupiter's. It orbits at 10 AU from Beta Pictoris, which is about 3.7 times farther than the orbit of Beta Pictoris c. It orbits close to the plane of the debris disk orbiting the star, with a low eccentricity and a period of 23.77 years.

== Physical characteristics ==
=== Mass, radius and temperature ===
Beta Pictoris b is a super-Jupiter, an exoplanet that has a radius and mass greater than that of the planet Jupiter. It has a temperature of 1,629 K (1,356 °C; 2,473 °F), most likely due to its dusty atmosphere and mass (normally it would be much colder). It has a mass of nine Jupiter masses (M_{J}), and a radius of either 1.37 or 1.680 R_{J}, depending on the method used for modelling the planet's spectrum. In 2018, a study directly measured the astrometric perturbation of Beta Pictoris by Beta Pictoris b, one of the first examples of an exoplanet being measured directly by its astrometric perturbation. Its mass was directly measured as 11±2 M_{J}.

=== Host star ===
The planet orbits an A-type main sequence star named Beta Pictoris. The star has a mass of 1.79 solar masses (M_{☉}) and a radius of 1.53 solar radii (R_{☉}). It has a surface temperature of 8054 K and is only 23 million years old. In comparison, the Sun is about 4.6 billion years old and has a surface temperature of 5778 K. It has a near solar metallicity, with a metal-to-hydrogen ratio equivalent to 102% of that found in the Sun. Its luminosity (L_{☉}) is 7.2 times that of the Sun.

The star's apparent magnitude, or how bright it appears from Earth's perspective, is 3.861. Therefore, it can be seen with the naked eye.

=== Orbit ===
Beta Pictoris b orbits its host star every 23.77 years at a semi-major axis of 10.0 AU (about the same as Saturn's distance, which is about 9.55 AU). It receives 11% of the amount of sunlight that Earth does from the Sun.

The orbit of the planet is well aligned to the rotation of the parent star and debris disk, with misalignment measured to be 3±5 degrees in 2020.

=== Planetary rotation ===
In 2014, the projected rotational velocity of Beta Pictoris b was calculated from the broadening of its carbon monoxide infrared absorption line. This makes it the first extrasolar planet to have its rotation rate measured. The rotational broadening corresponds to an equatorial velocity of 25±3 km/s, significantly faster than the planets in our Solar System. Assuming zero obliquity and a planetary radius 1.65±0.06 times that of Jupiter, this corresponds to a rotation period of 8.1±1.0 hours. A 2024 study using CRIRES+ gave a slightly lower rotation velocity of 19.9±1.0 km/s. Using a radius value of 1.4±0.1 Jupiter radii, this corresponds to a rotation period of 8.7±0.8 hours, again assuming zero obliquity.

If the planet has a significant obliquity, the true rotation period may be substantially shorter than these inferred values. While giant planets are expected to form with low obliquities, dynamical processes such as collisions or secular spin-orbit resonances induced by satellites may result in the planet's rotation being tilted.

Observations of the planet with GRAVITY+ over a 7-hour timeframe indicate variability at roughly half the predicted rotation period, which may correspond to features at opposing longitudes rotating in and out of view, but further observations are needed to confirm this. Another study, which monitors the planet's variability over a 16-hour timeframe with the James Webb Space Telescope, found a rotation period of 9.00±0.13 hours, suggesting that the planet's rotation is aligned with its orbital plane.

=== Radio emission ===
In 2026 a pre-print described radio emission at 0.85 to 3.5 GHz with the MeerKAT array located in South Africa. The researchers showed that the emission is inconsistent with the position of the star and with planet c. It is instead consistent with the position of planet b. The emission has two components. One is persistent emission. The other is rapid reocurring and highly circularly polarized bursts, which come from electron cyclotron maser, associated with an aurora. The researchers detected three left-handed bursts in the 2025 observation, with the first and last burst being around 8 hours apart, which may be a signature of rotational modulation. A fourth right-handed burst was detected in 2026. The researchers estimate a magnetic field of B ≥ 1.25 kG.

== Discovery ==
The planet was discovered on November 18, 2008, by Anne-Marie Lagrange et al., using the NACO instrument on the Very Large Telescope at Cerro Paranal in northern Chile. This planet was discovered using the direct imaging technique, using reference star differential imaging. The discovery image was taken in 2003, but the planet was not detected when the data were first reduced. A re-reduction of the data in 2008 using modern image processing tools revealed the faint point source now known to be a planet.

=== Further studies ===
Follow-up observations performed in late 2009 and early 2010 using the same instrument recovered and confirmed the planet, but on the opposite side of the star. These findings were published in the journal Science and represented the closest orbiting planet to its star ever imaged. Observations performed in late 2010 and early 2011 allowed scientists to establish an inclination angle of the planet's orbit of 88.5 degrees, nearly edge-on. The location of the planet was found to be approximately 3.5 to 4 degrees tilted from the main disk in this system, indicating that the planet is aligned with the warped inner disk in the Beta Pictoris system.

The first study of the spectral energy distribution of the planet was published in July 2013. This study shows detections at 1.265, 1.66, 2.18, 3.80, 4.05 and 4.78 μm demonstrating that the planet has a very dusty and/or cloudy atmosphere. The SED is consistent with that of an early L dwarf, but with a lower surface gravity. The effective temperature is constrained to 1700±100 K and the surface gravity to log g = 4.0±0.5. A second study, published in September 2013, provided a new detection at 3.1 μm obtained at the Gemini Observatory along with a reanalysis of previous data. They found the planet to be overluminous in the mid-infrared 3.1 μm band compared to models of early L dwarfs. Models incorporating small dust particles and thick clouds provided the best fit to the SED. The effective temperature is constrained to 1600+50
−25 K and the surface gravity to log g = 3.8±0.02. This fit corresponds to a planet radius of 1.65 times that of Jupiter, arguing that Beta Pictoris b may be younger than its host star (finished forming at 5 Ma).

In 2015, a short video was made from direct images of Beta Pictoris b taken by the Gemini Planet Imager over the course of about two years showing a time-lapse of the planet orbiting around its parent star. The orbit is close to edge-on and the planet had been suspected of causing a transit-like event in 1981. Nevertheless, a campaign to observe the transit of the planet or of material within its Hill sphere during the 2017–2018 transit window indicated that no transits are occurring. In 2018, the PicSat cubesat was launched to observe the potential transit, but failed several weeks after launch.

As of 2026, the orbital parameters and mass of Beta Pictoris b have been measured using a combination of data from radial velocity, astrometry and imaging, showing that it has about 8.7 times the mass of Jupiter with an orbital period of 23.77 years and a semi-major axis of about 10.0 AU.

== Searches for exomoons ==
The use of astrometry has set limits on the presence of exomoons around the planet. For short orbital periods (around 50 days), objects with masses over 0.6 M_{J} are ruled out, while at periods of roughly 200 days, this limit is 0.3 M_{J}. At orbital periods of 700 and 1,100 days, exomoons with masses over 0.15 M_{J} and 0.10 M_{J}, respectively, are ruled out.

One 2026 study searched for exomoons by analysing radial velocity data from the CRIRES+ spectrograph aboard the Very Large Telescope, but none was revealed. Their detection limits for a single moon are a 80 M_{🜨} object orbiting with a period of one day, and a 1 M_{J} object orbiting with a period of 200 days. The non-detections in both radial-velocity and astrometric data rule out any exomoon over three times more massive than Saturn in the Hill sphere.

A potential clue to the presence of exomoons would be if the planet has a substantial obliquity. Giant planets are expected to form with low obliquities, but this could be modified by collisions with other planets, or by secular spin-orbit resonances induced by exomoons. In the case of Beta Pictoris b, collisions capable of significantly altering the obliquity are considered unlikely, while dynamical interactions with satellites remain a viable possibility. For example, a moon exceeding 15 Earth masses (roughly the mass of Neptune) on an orbit between 40 and 70 planetary radii would be able to excite the planetary obliquity to 60° on a timescale of roughly 1 million years. Measurements indicate that the planet's equator is viewed edge-on, consistent with aligned rotation.

== Gallery ==
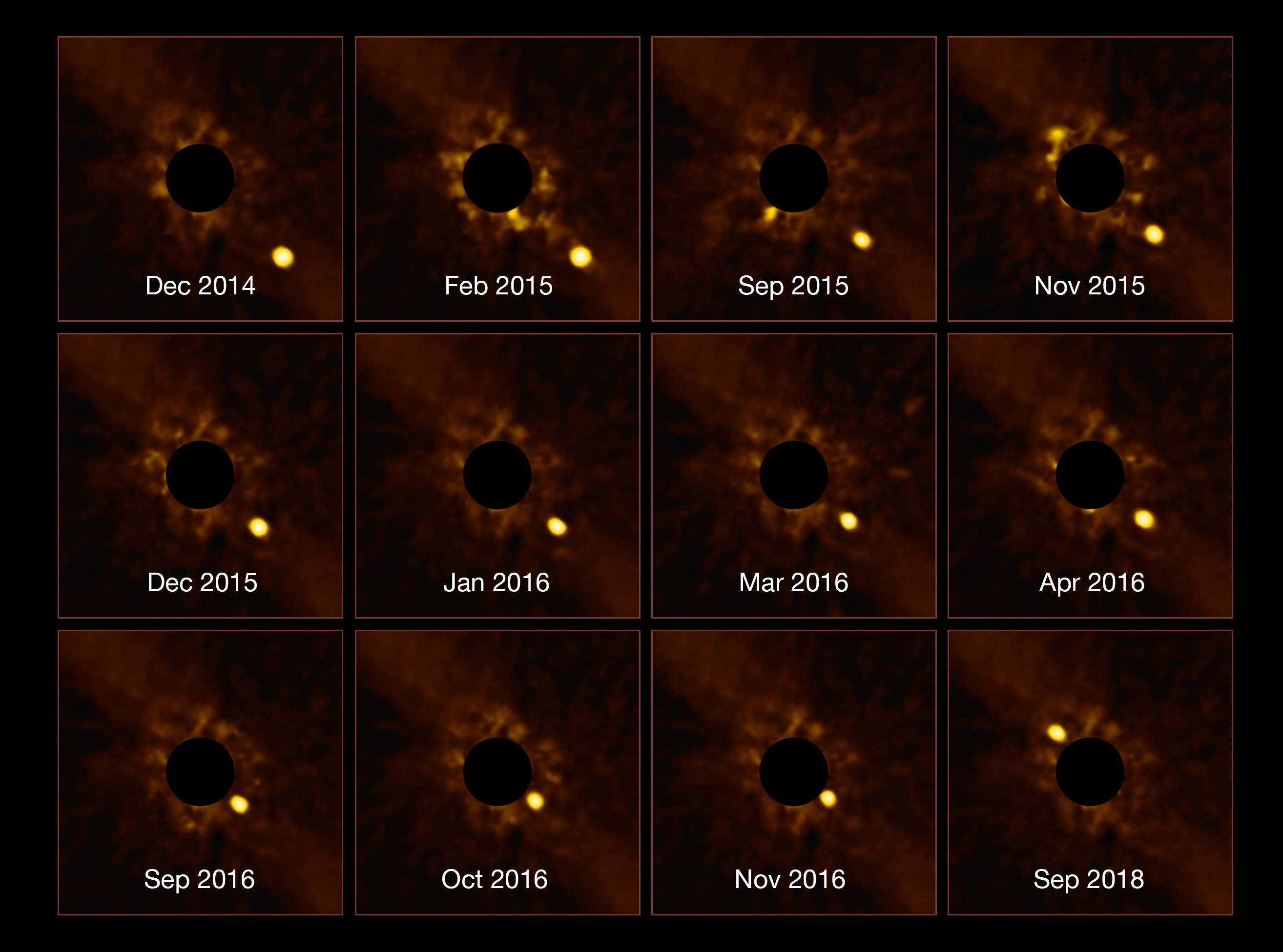
Beta Pictoris b time-lapse.

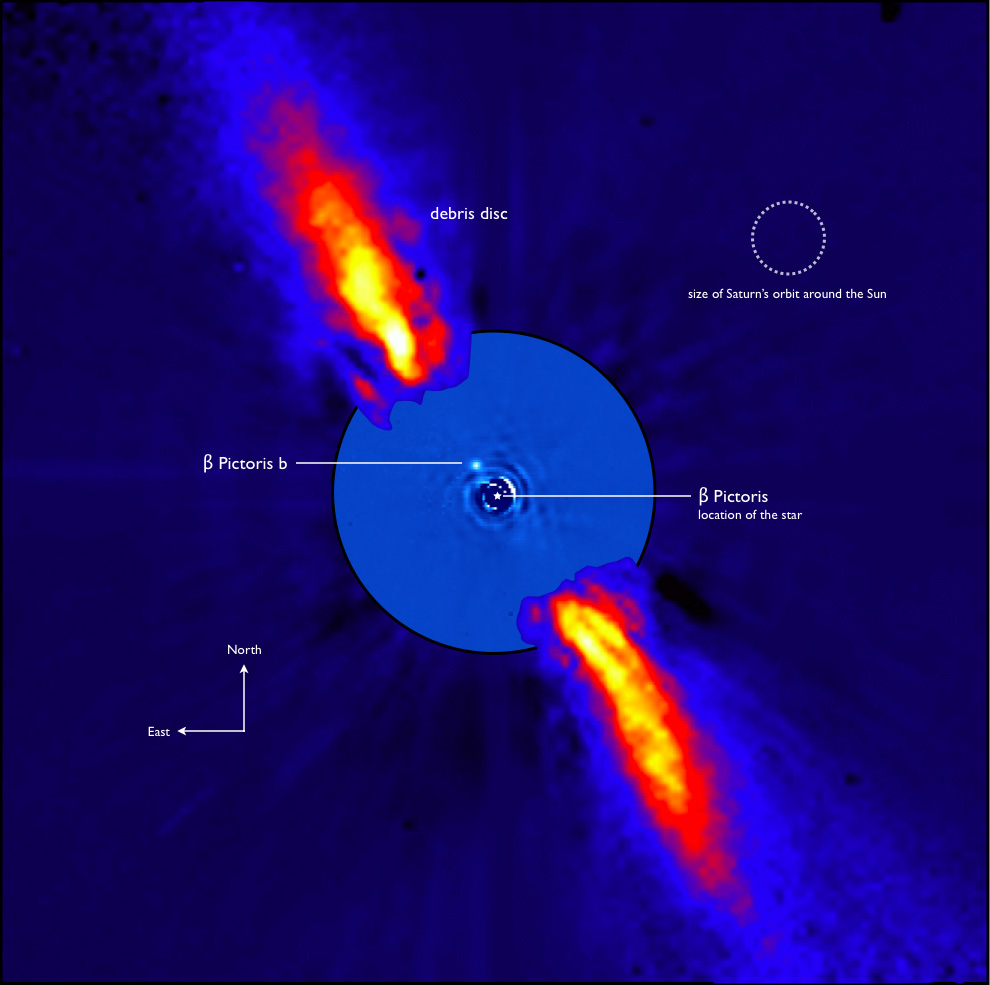
An annotated view of the Beta Pictoris system.

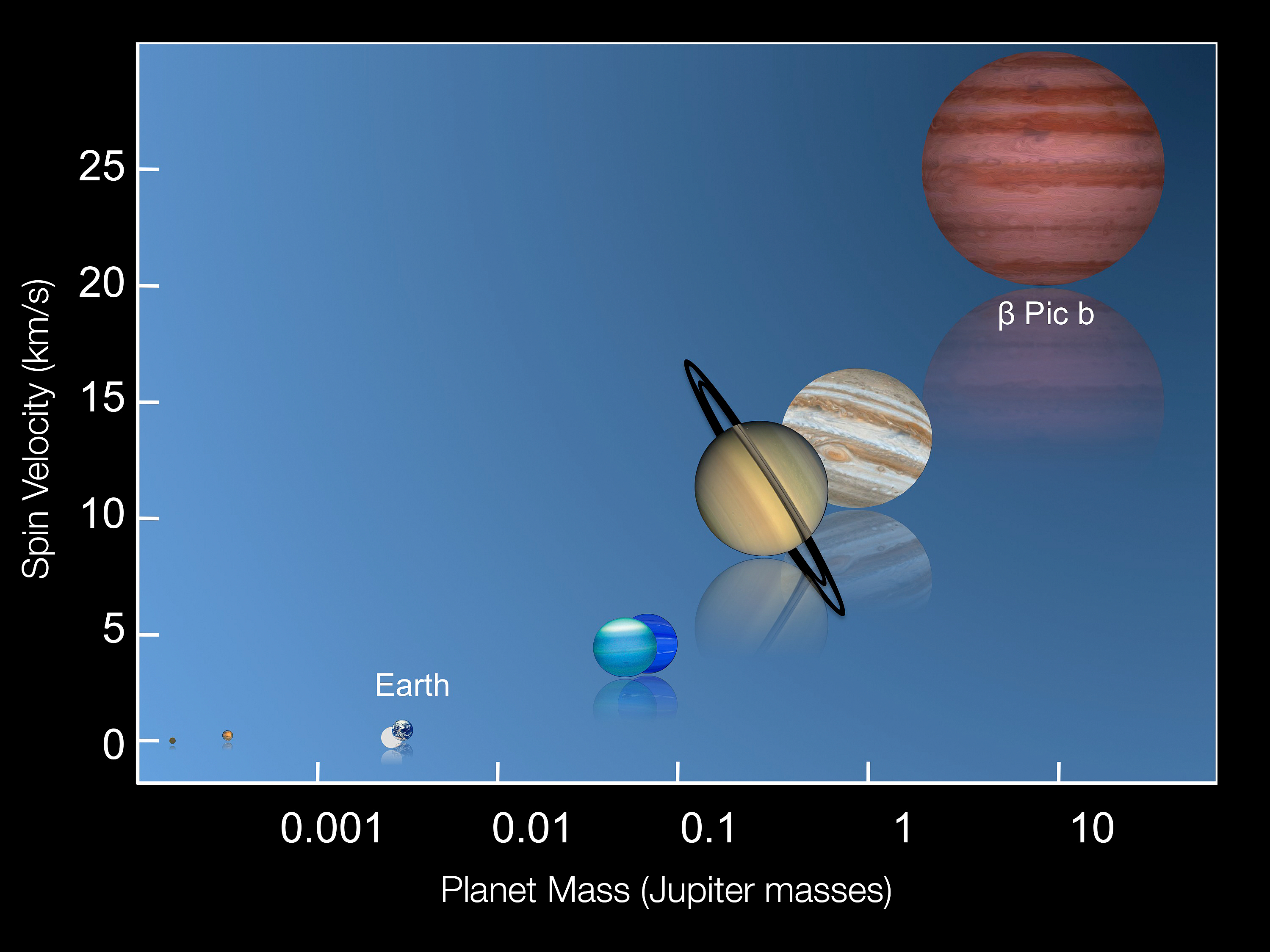
Equatorial spin velocity vs mass for planets comparing Beta Pictoris b to the Solar System planets.

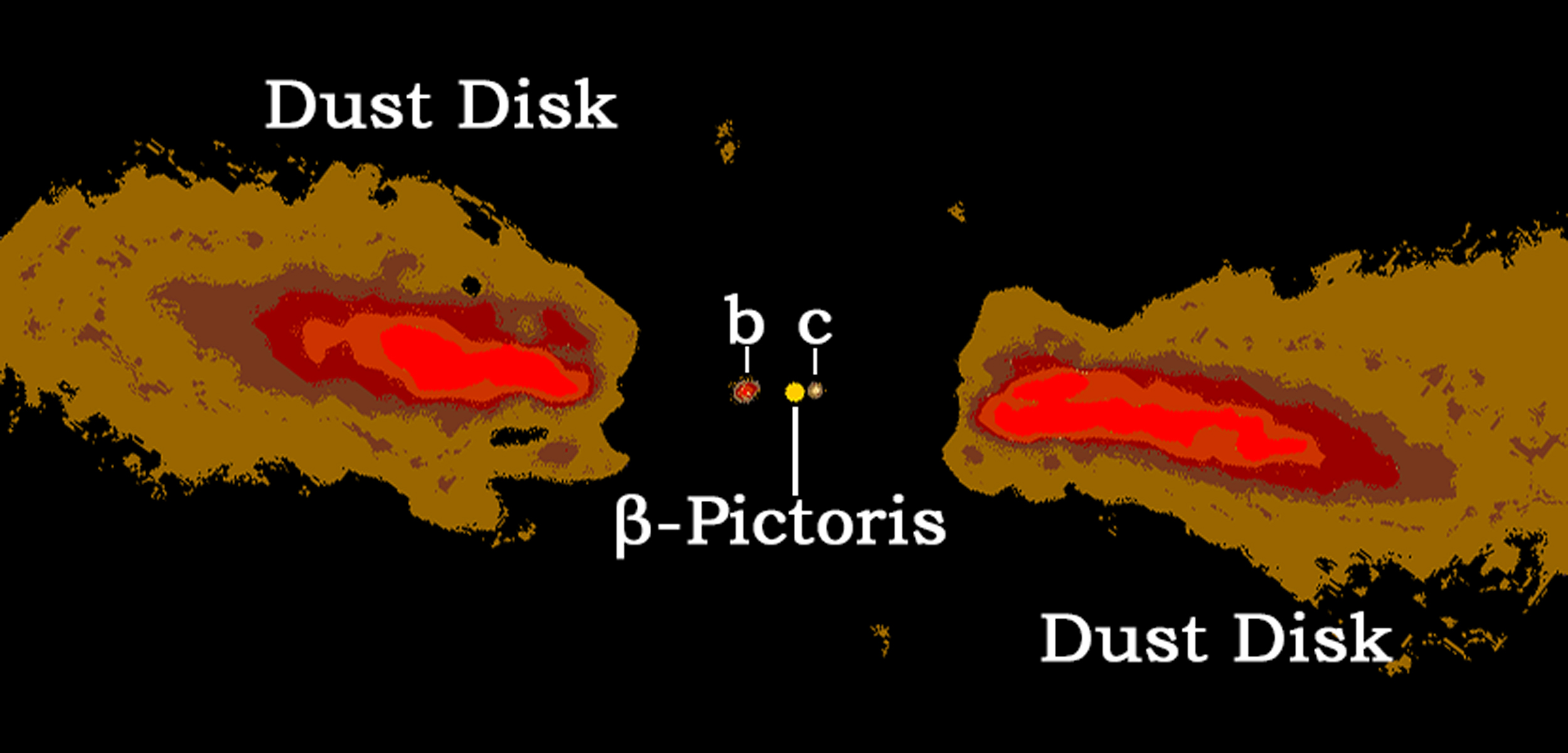
Artistic rendering of the Beta Pictoris system, showing the accretion disk, and the two planets.

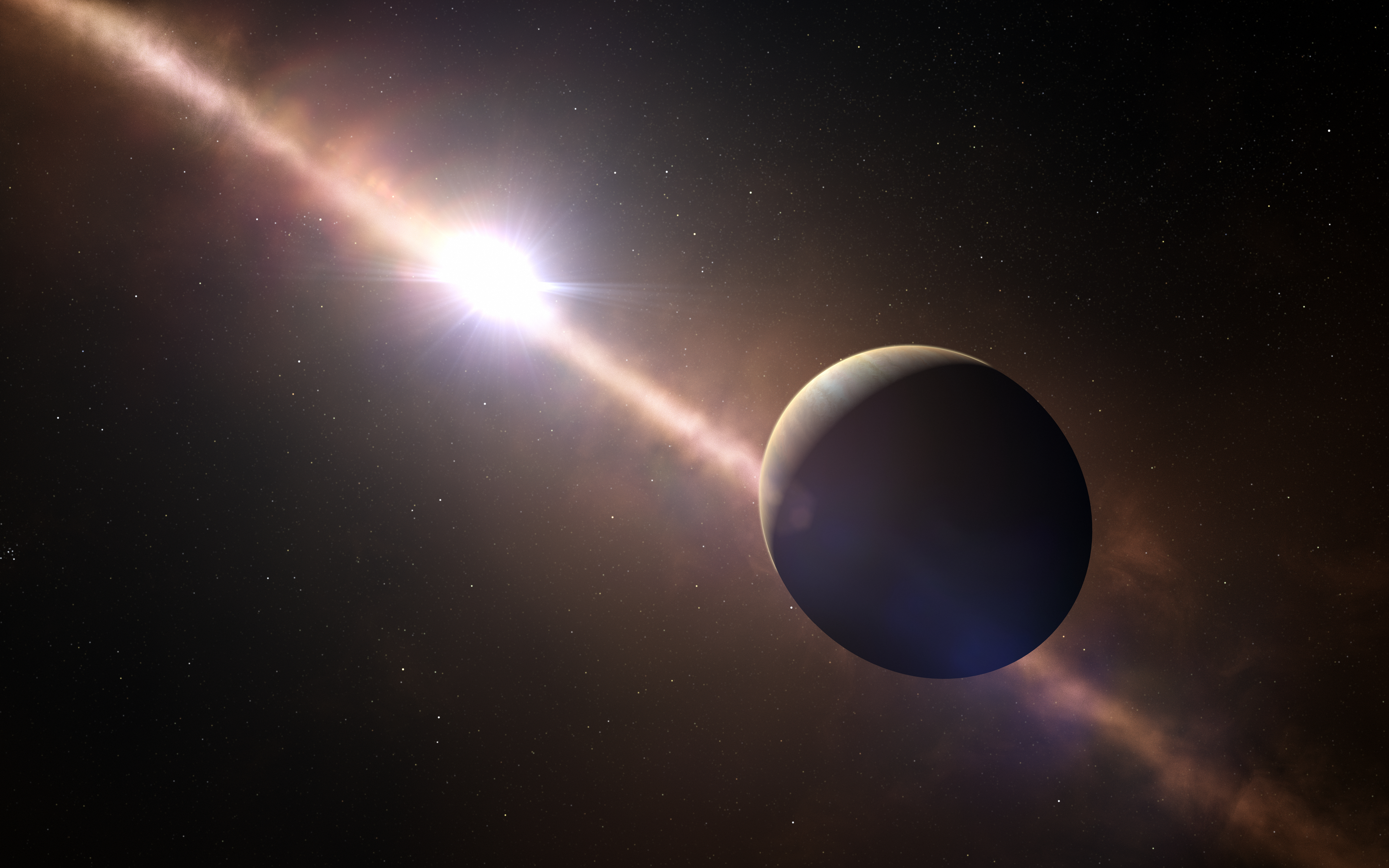
Artist's impression of Beta Pictoris b. The debris disk around the parent star can be seen.

== See also ==
- Beta Pictoris
- Beta Pictoris c
- PicSat
- ROXs 42Bb
- List of largest exoplanets
