= Beta Pictoris =

Second brightest star in the southern constellation of Pictor

β Pictoris
- Location of β Pictoris (circled)

Observation data Epoch J2000 Equinox ICRS
- Constellation: Pictor
- Right ascension: 05^{h} 47^{m} 17.09^{s}
- Declination: −51° 03′ 59.4″
- Apparent magnitude (V): 3.86

Characteristics
- Evolutionary stage: main sequence
- Spectral type: A6V
- U−B color index: 0.10
- B−V color index: 0.17
- Variable type: Delta Scuti variable

Astrometry
| Radial velocity (R_{v}) | +20.0±0.7 km/s |
| Proper motion (μ) | RA: +4.65 mas/yr Dec.: +83.10 mas/yr |
| Parallax (π) | 51.44±0.12 mas |
| Distance | 63.4 ± 0.1 ly (19.44 ± 0.05 pc) |
| Absolute magnitude (M_{V}) | 2.402 |

Details
| Mass | 1.789+0.024 −0.027 M_{☉} |
| Radius | 1.53±0.01 R_{☉} |
| Luminosity | 8.7 L_{☉} |
| Surface gravity (log g) | 4.18±0.13 cgs |
| Temperature | 8,054±96 K |
| Metallicity | $\begin{smallmatrix}\left[\ce{M}/\ce{H}\right]\end{smallmatrix}$ = −0.01±0.03 |
| Rotational velocity (v sin i) | 130 km/s |
| Age | 23±3 Myr |

Other designations
- GJ 219, HR 2020, CD−51°1620, HD 39060, GCTP 1339.00, SAO 234134, HIP 27321

Database references
| SIMBAD | data |
| Exoplanet Archive | data |
| ARICNS | data |

This video sequence is based on an artist's impression of exocomets orbiting the star Beta Pictoris.

Beta Pictoris (abbreviated β Pictoris or β Pic) is the second brightest star in the constellation Pictor. It is located 63.4 light-years (19.4 pc) from the Solar System, and is 1.79 times as massive and 8.7 times as luminous as the Sun. The Beta Pictoris system is very young, only 23 million years old, although it is already in the main sequence stage of its evolution. Beta Pictoris is the title member of the Beta Pictoris moving group, an association of young stars which share the same motion through space and have the same age.

Beta Pictoris has three confirmed planets, Beta Pictoris b, Beta Pictoris c, and Beta Pictoris d. All three planets have been detected through the use of direct imaging, although Beta Pictoris c was first confirmed using the radial velocity method. The three planets are orbiting in the plane of the debris disk surrounding the star. Beta Pictoris c is currently the closest extrasolar planet to its star ever photographed: the observed separation is roughly the same as the distance between the asteroid belt and the Sun.

Beta Pictoris shows an excess of infrared emission compared to normal stars of its type, which is caused by large quantities of dust and gas (including carbon monoxide) near the star. Detailed observations reveal a large disk of dust and gas orbiting the star, which was the first debris disk to be imaged around another star. In addition to the presence of several planetesimal belts and cometary activity, there are indications that planets have formed within this disk and that the processes of planet formation may be ongoing. Material from the Beta Pictoris debris disk is thought to be the dominant source of interstellar meteoroids in the Solar System.

== Location and visibility ==
Beta Pictoris is a star in the southern constellation of Pictor, the Easel, and is located to the west of the bright star Canopus. It traditionally marked the sounding line of the ship Argo Navis, before the constellation was split. The star has an apparent visual magnitude of 3.86, so is visible to the naked eye under good conditions, though light pollution may result in stars dimmer than magnitude 3 being too dim to see. It is the second brightest in its constellation, exceeded only by Alpha Pictoris, which has an apparent magnitude of 3.30.

The distance to Beta Pictoris and many other stars was measured by the Hipparcos satellite. This was done by measuring its trigonometric parallax: the slight displacement in its position observed as the Earth moves around the Sun. Beta Pictoris was found to exhibit a parallax of 51.87 milliarcseconds, a value which was later revised to 51.44 milliarcseconds when the data was reanalyzed taking systematic errors more carefully into account. The distance to Beta Pictoris is therefore 63.4 light years, with an uncertainty of 0.1 light years. (Note: The parallax can be converted into distance using the equation: $\scriptstyle\mathrm{Distance\ in\ parsecs}=\frac{1}{\mathrm{parallax\ in\ arcseconds}}$. See the article on propagation of uncertainty for information on how errors on derived values can be calculated.)

The Hipparcos satellite also measured the proper motion of Beta Pictoris: it is traveling eastwards at a rate of 4.65 milliarcseconds per year, and northwards at a rate of 83.10 milliarcseconds per year. Measurements of the Doppler shift of the star's spectrum reveals it is moving away from Earth at a rate of 20 km/s. Several other stars share the same motion through space as Beta Pictoris and likely formed from the same gas cloud at roughly the same time: these comprise the Beta Pictoris moving group.

== Physical properties ==
=== Spectrum, luminosity and variability ===
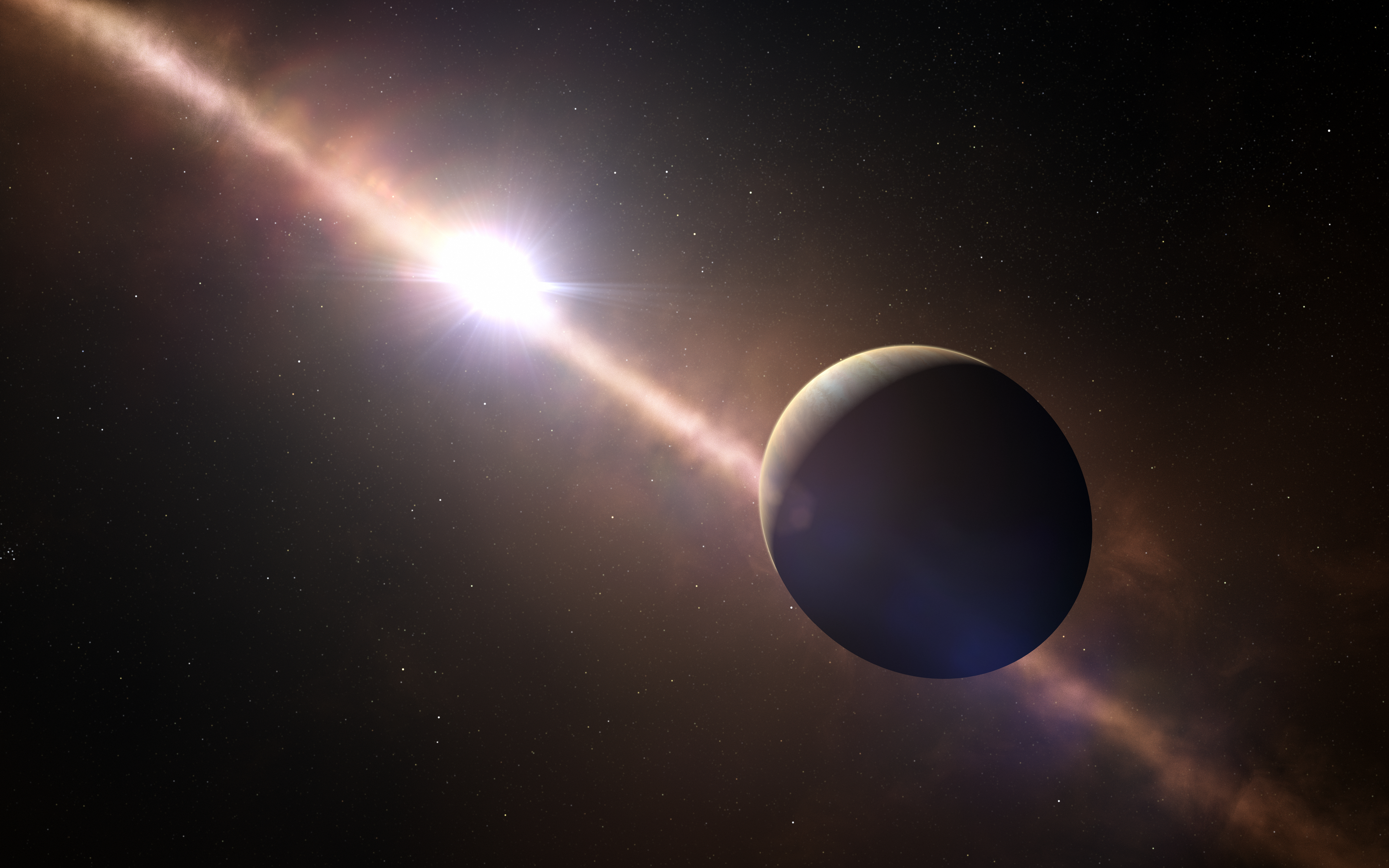
Artist's impression of the planet Beta Pictoris b

According to measurements made as part of the Nearby Stars Project, Beta Pictoris has a spectral type of A6V. It has an effective temperature of 8,054 K (7,781 °C; 14,038 °F), which is hotter than the Sun's 5,778 K (5,505 °C; 9,941 °F). Analysis of the spectrum reveals that the star contains nearly the same ratio of heavy elements, which are termed metals in astronomy, to hydrogen than the Sun. This value is expressed as the quantity [M/H], the base-10 logarithm of the ratio of the star's metal fraction to that of the Sun. In the case of Beta Pictoris, the value of [M/H] is +0.01±0.03, which means that the star's metal fraction is 1.023+0.024
−0.069 that of the Sun. (Note: Calculated from [M/H]: relative abundance = 10^{[M/H]})

Analysis of the spectrum can also reveal the surface gravity of the star. This is usually expressed as log g, the base-10 logarithm of the gravitational acceleration given in CGS units, in this case, cm/s². Beta Pictoris has log g=4.18, implying a surface gravity of 150 m/s², which is 55% of the gravitational acceleration at the surface of the Sun (274 m/s²).

As an A-type main sequence star, Beta Pictoris is more luminous than the Sun: combining the apparent magnitude of 3.86 with the distance of 19.44 parsecs gives an absolute magnitude of 2.4, as compared to the Sun, which has an absolute magnitude of 4.83. This corresponds to a visual luminosity 9.2 times greater than that of the Sun. (Note: The visual luminosity can be calculated by: $\scriptstyle\frac{L_{V_{\ast}}}{L_{V_{\odot}}} = 10^{0.4(M_{V_{\odot}} - M_{V_{\ast}})}$) When the entire spectrum of radiation from Beta Pictoris and the Sun is taken into account, Beta Pictoris is found to be 8.7 times more luminous than the Sun.

Many main sequence stars of spectral type A fall into a region of the Hertzsprung–Russell diagram called the instability strip, which is occupied by pulsating variable stars. In 2003, photometric monitoring of the star revealed variations in brightness of around 1–2 millimagnitudes on frequencies between about 30 and 40 minutes. Radial velocity studies of Beta Pictoris also reveal variability: there are pulsations at two frequencies, one at 30.4 minutes and one at 36.9 minutes. As a result, the star is classified as a Delta Scuti variable.

=== Mass, radius and rotation ===
The mass of Beta Pictoris has been determined from the orbital modelling of its three planets. This method yields a stellar mass of 1.79 solar masses. The star's angular diameter has been measured using interferometry with the Very Large Telescope and was found to be 0.84 milliarcseconds, giving it an actual radius 1.732±0.013 times that of the Sun (R_{☉}). The angular diameter has later been revised to 0.736±0.019 mas, which would give a lower radius of 1.53 R_{☉}, consistent with that of atmospheric fitting.

The rotational velocity of Beta Pictoris has been measured to be at least 130 km/s. Since this value is derived by measuring radial velocities, this is a lower limit on the true rotational velocity: the quantity measured is actually v sin(i), where i represents the inclination of the star's axis of rotation to the line-of-sight. If it is assumed that Beta Pictoris is viewed from Earth in its equatorial plane, a reasonable assumption since the circumstellar disk is seen edge-on, the rotation period can be calculated as approximately 16 hours, which is significantly shorter than that of the Sun (609.12 hours). (Note: The rotation period can be calculated using the equations of circular motion: $\scriptstyle P_{\mathrm{rot}} = \frac{2\pi r}{v_{\mathrm{rot}}}$) Observations with GRAVITY+ did show that the position angle (PA) of the stellar rotation is 32.09°±0.9° (east of north), which is better aligned with the inner warped secondary disk.

=== Age and formation ===
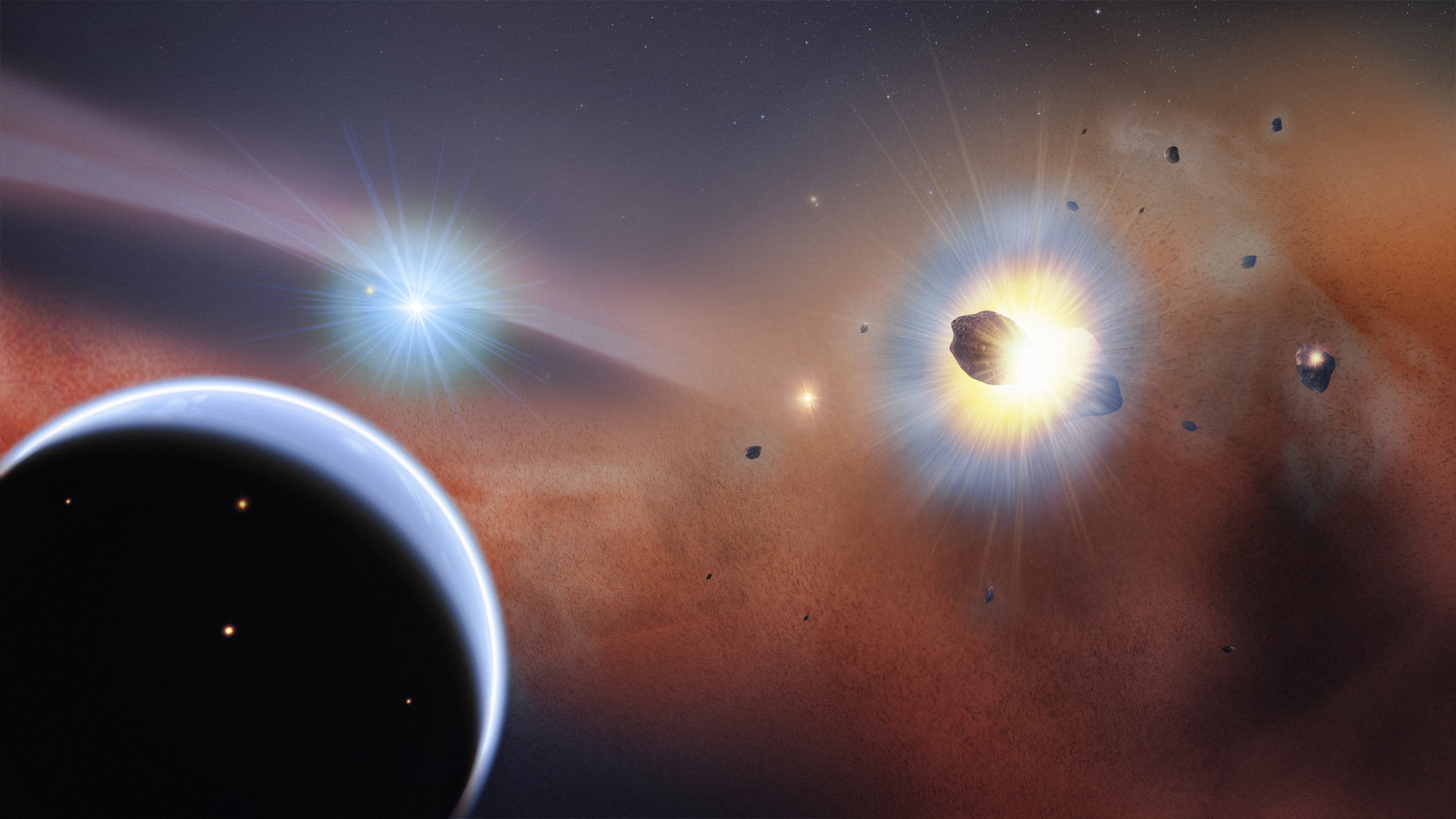
Artist's impression of Beta Pictoris

The presence of significant amounts of dust around the star implies a young age of the system and led to debate about whether it had joined the main sequence or was still a pre–main sequence star However, when the star's distance was measured by Hipparcos it was revealed that Beta Pictoris was located farther away than previously thought and hence was more luminous than originally believed. Once the Hipparcos results were taken into account, it was found that Beta Pictoris was located close to the zero age main sequence and was not a pre–main sequence star after all. Analysis of Beta Pictoris and other stars within the Beta Pictoris moving group suggested that they are around 12 million years old. However more recent studies indicate that the age is roughly double this at 20 to 26 million years old.

Beta Pictoris may have been formed near the Scorpius–Centaurus association. The collapse of the gas cloud which resulted in the formation of Beta Pictoris may have been triggered by the shock wave from a supernova explosion: the star which went supernova may have been a former companion of HD 83058, which is now a runaway star. Tracing the path of HIP 46950 backwards suggests that it would have been in the vicinity of the Scorpius–Centaurus association about 13 million years ago. However, HD 83058 has been found to be a spectroscopic binary and unlikely to have been ejected by the supernova explosion of a close companion, so the simple explanation for the origin of the Beta Pictoris cluster is in doubt.

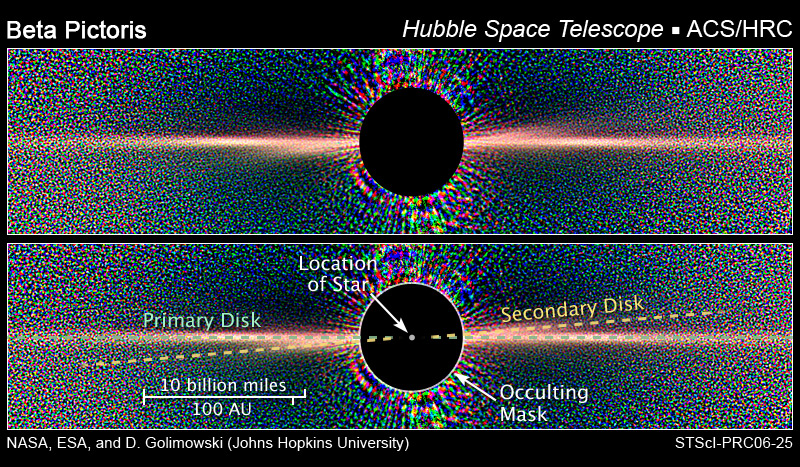
Hubble Space Telescope image of the main and secondary debris disks

== Circumstellar environment ==
=== Debris disks ===
Erika Nesvold and Marc Kuchner discuss their supercomputer simulation of how the planet Beta Pictoris b sculpts the Beta Pictoris debris disk into a warped spiral shape.

Excess infrared radiation from Beta Pictoris was detected by the IRAS spacecraft in 1983. Along with Vega, Fomalhaut and Epsilon Eridani, it was one of the first four stars from which such an excess was detected: these stars are called "Vega-like" after the first such star discovered. Since A-type stars like Beta Pictoris tend to radiate most of their energy at the blue end of the spectrum, (Note: From Wien's displacement law and a temperature of 8102 K the peak wavelength emission from Beta Pictoris would be around 360 nanometers which is in the near-ultraviolet region of the spectrum.) this implied the presence of cool matter in orbit around the star, which would radiate at infrared wavelengths and produce the excess. This hypothesis was verified in 1984 when Beta Pictoris became the first star to have its circumstellar disk imaged optically. The IRAS data are (at the micron wavelengths): [12]=2.68, [25]=0.05, [60]=−2.74 and [100]=−3.41. The colour excesses are: E12=0.69, E25=3.35, E60=6.17 and E100=6.90. The debris disk around Beta Pictoris is seen edge-on by observers on Earth, and is oriented in a northeast-southwest direction. The disk is asymmetric: in the northeast direction it has been observed out to 1835 astronomical units from the star, while the southwest direction the extent is 1450 AU. The disk is rotating: the part to the northeast of the star is moving away from Earth, while the part to the southwest of the disc is moving towards Earth.

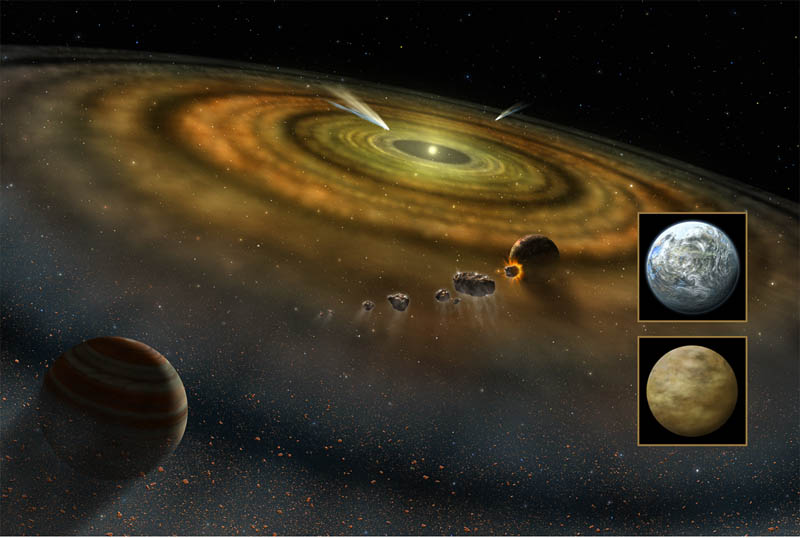
Artist's impression of planet formation processes occurring in the disc around Beta Pictoris

Several elliptical rings of material have been observed in the outer regions of the debris disk between 500 and 800 AU: these may have formed as a result of the system being disrupted by a passing star. Astrometric data from the Hipparcos mission reveal that the red giant star Beta Columbae passed within 2 light years of Beta Pictoris about 110,000 years ago, but a larger perturbation would have been caused by Zeta Doradus, which passed at a distance of 3 light years about 350,000 years ago. However, computer simulations favor a lower encounter velocity than either of these two candidates, which suggest that the star responsible for the rings may have been a companion star of Beta Pictoris on an unstable orbit. The simulations suggest a perturbing star with a mass of 0.5 solar masses is likely to blame for the structures. Such a star would be a red dwarf of spectral type M0V.

In 2006, imaging of the system with the Hubble Space Telescope's Advanced Camera for Surveys revealed the presence of a secondary dust disk inclined at an angle of about 5° to the main disk and extending at least 130 AU from the star. The secondary disk is asymmetrical: the southwest extension is more curved and less inclined than the northeast. The imaging was not good enough to distinguish between the main and secondary disks within 80 AU of Beta Pictoris; however, the northeast extension of the dust disk is predicted to intersect with the main disk at about 30 AU from the star. The secondary disk may be produced by a massive planet in an inclined orbit removing matter from the primary disk and causing it to move in an orbit aligned with the planet.

Studies made with the NASA Far Ultraviolet Spectroscopic Explorer have discovered that the disk around Beta Pictoris contains an extreme overabundance of carbon-rich gas. This helps stabilize the disk against radiation pressure, which would otherwise blow the material away into interstellar space. Currently, there are two suggested explanations for the origin of the carbon overabundance. Beta Pictoris might be in the process of forming exotic carbon-rich planets, in contrast to the terrestrial planets in the Solar System, which are rich in oxygen instead of carbon. Alternatively, it may be passing through an unknown phase that might also have occurred early in the development of the Solar System: in the Solar System there are carbon-rich meteorites known as enstatite chondrites, which may have formed in a carbon-rich environment. It has also been proposed that Jupiter may have formed around a carbon-rich core.

In 2011 the disk around Beta Pictoris became the first other planetary system to be photographed by an amateur astronomer. Rolf Olsen of New Zealand captured the disk with a 10-inch Newtonian reflector and a modified webcam.

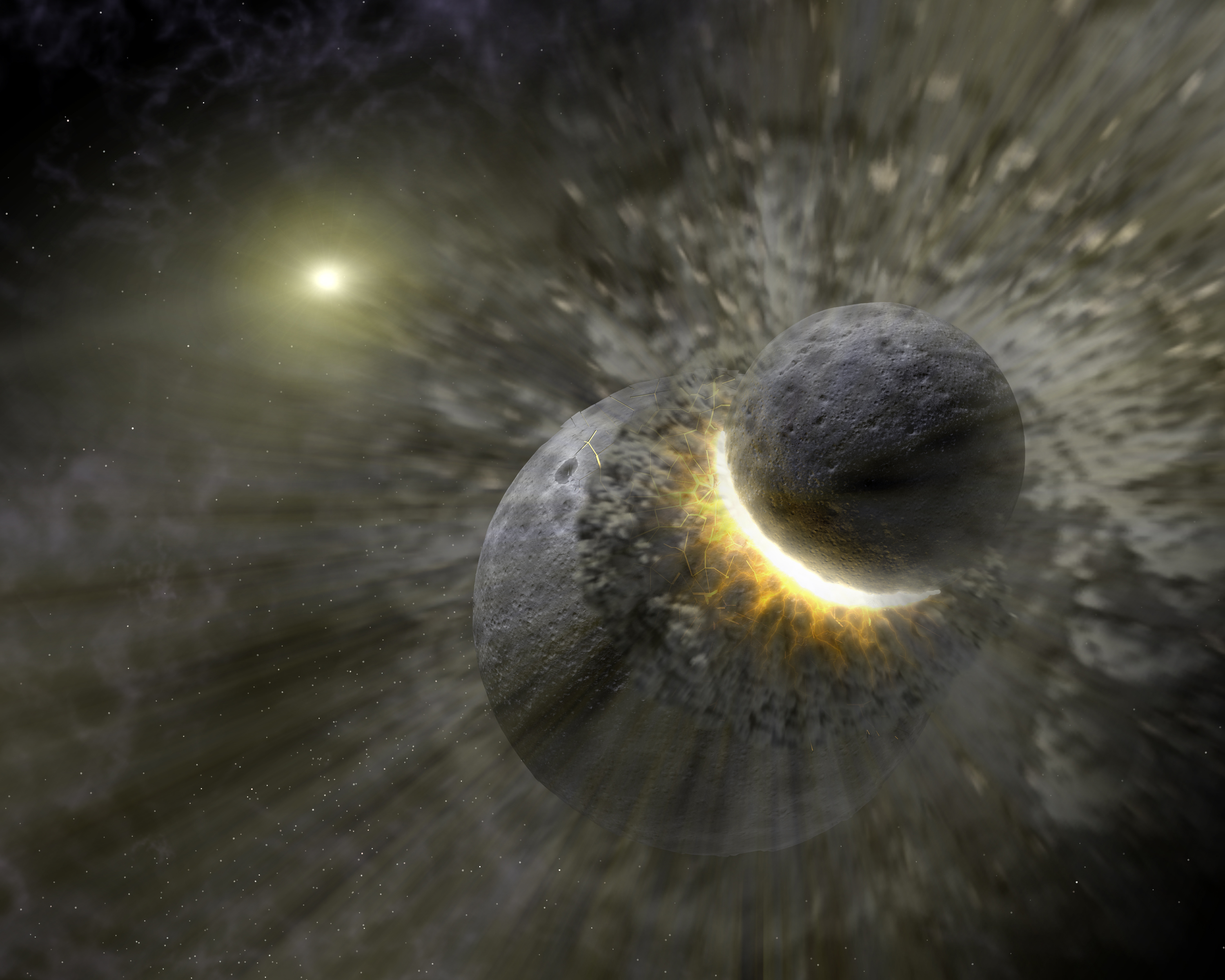
Artist's impression of a collision between planetesimals.

=== Planetesimal belts ===
In 2003, imaging of the inner region of the Beta Pictoris system with the Keck II telescope revealed the presence of several features which are interpreted as being belts or rings of material. Belts at approximately 14, 28, 52 and 82 astronomical units from the star were detected, which alternate in inclination with respect to the main disk.

Observations in 2004 revealed the presence of an inner belt containing silicate material at a distance of 6.4 AU from the star. Silicate material was also detected at 16 and 30 AU from the star, with a lack of dust between 6.4 and 16 AU providing evidence that a massive planet may be orbiting in this region. Magnesium-rich olivine has also been detected, strikingly similar to that found in the Solar System comets and different from the olivine found in Solar System asteroids. Olivine crystals can only form closer than 10 AU from the star; therefore they have been transported to the belt after formation, probably by radial mixing.

Modeling of the dust disk at 100 AU from the star suggests the dust in this region may have been produced by a series of collisions initiated by the destruction of planetesimals with radii of about 180 kilometers. After the initial collision, the debris undergoes further collisions in a process called a collisional cascade. Similar processes have been inferred in the debris disks around Fomalhaut and AU Microscopii.

Two giant collisions are thought to have taken place in the past around Beta Pictoris. The first suspected collision occurred around 150 years ago and involved a mass between 10^{19} to 10^{21} kg, which translates to a body with a size between 100 and 500 km. This collision occurred around 85 au from the host star. This first collision could explain the so-called cat's tail seen only in JWST images of the debris disk. Comparisons were made between Spitzer observations (2004–2005) and JWST observations (2023). This showed that the 600 Kelvin hot dust continuum, as well as a forsterite signature, disappeared. This was interpreted as another collision that occurred a few years before 2004. The dust produced in the collision was blown out by radiation pressure from the star in the years between 2005 and 2023.

=== Falling evaporating bodies ===
The spectrum of Beta Pictoris shows strong short-term variability that was first noticed in the red-shifted part of various absorption lines, which was interpreted as being caused by material falling onto the star. The source of this material was suggested to be small comet-like objects on orbits which take them close to the star where they begin to evaporate, termed the "falling evaporating bodies" model. Transient blue-shifted absorption events were also detected, though less frequently: these may represent a second group of objects on a different set of orbits. Detailed modeling indicates the falling evaporating bodies are unlikely to be mainly icy like comets, but instead are probably composed of a mixed dust and ice core with a crust made of refractory materials. These objects may have been perturbed onto their star-grazing orbits by the gravitational influence of a planet in a mildly eccentric orbit around Beta Pictoris at a distance of roughly 10 AU from the star. Falling evaporating bodies may also be responsible for the presence of gas located high above the plane of the main debris disk. A study from 2019 reported transiting exocomets with TESS. The dips are asymmetric in nature and are consistent with models of evaporating comets crossing the disc of the star. The comets are in a highly eccentric orbit and are non-periodic. In 2025 a paper was published that studied 17 years of HARPS observations, spanning 9000 observations. The work studied the calcium II (singly-ionized calcium) and sodium I (neutral sodium) lines. Sodium was mostly absent, except for two nights with a 2% deep line and a 1% deep feature over 13 nights in 2004. These sodium detections occur during deep calcium absorption. The study found long-lived calcium absorption in 2017 and 2018 that persist for over a year, which is difficult to explain with the classical exocomet model. In 2019 two strongly accelerating blue-shifted exocomets are seen. These show a departure from Keplerian motion and can be explained by the breakup of comet nuclei, shortly after the periastron passages.

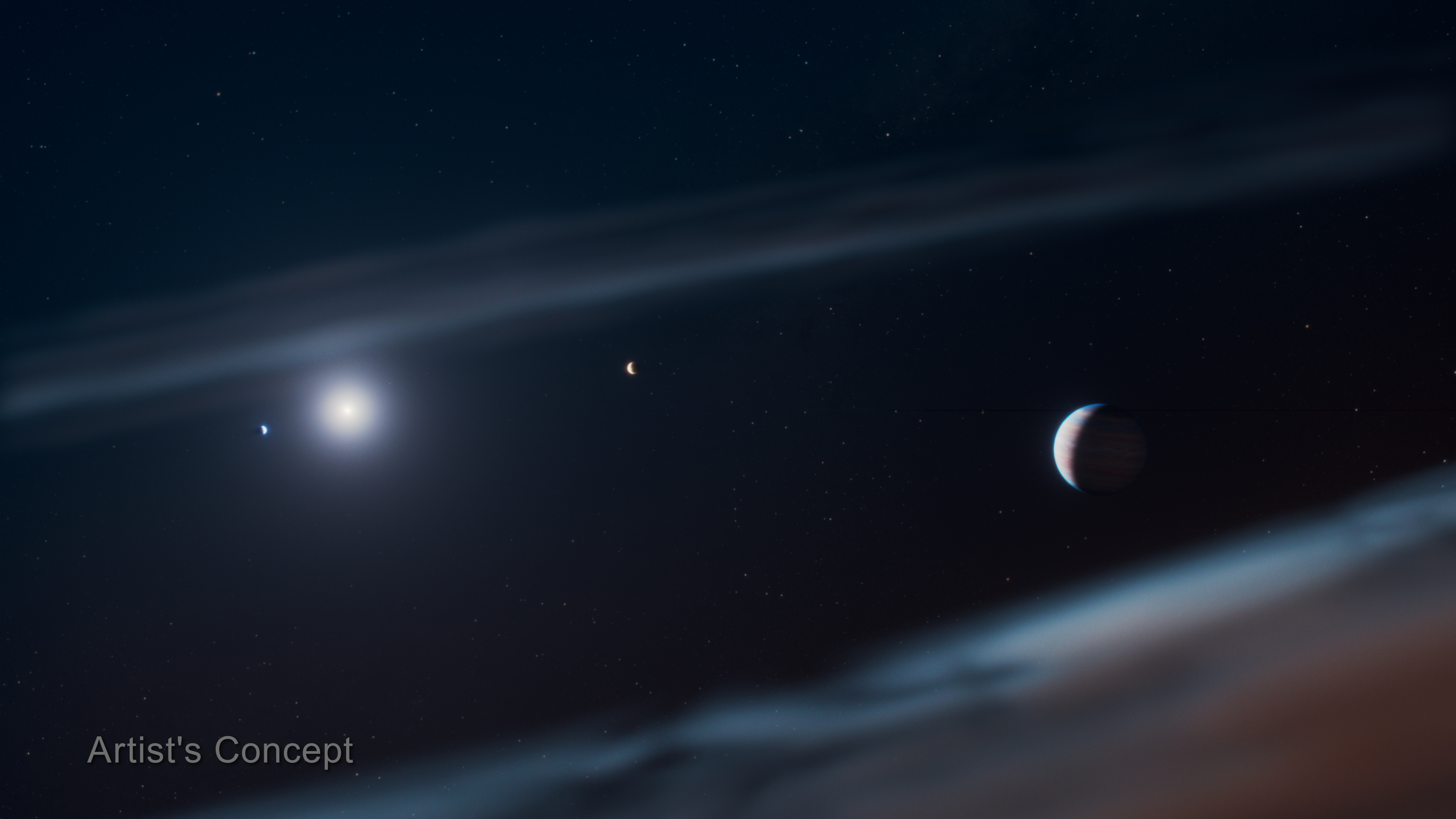
Artist impression of Beta Pictoris System

=== Planetary system ===
The Beta Pictoris planetary system
| Companion (in order from star) | Mass | Semimajor axis (AU) | Orbital period (years) | Eccentricity | Inclination (°) | Radius |
|---|---|---|---|---|---|---|
| c | 8.89±0.75 M_{J} | 2.70±0.03 | 3.29+0.07 −0.03 | 0.307+0.019 −0.025 | 88.93+0.11 −0.09 | 1.2±0.1 R_{J} |
| b | 11.90+2.93 −3.04 M_{J} | 10.07±0.03 | 23.77+0.15 −0.16 | 0.105+0.004 −0.003 | 88.993+0.010 −0.011 | 1.37±0.02; 1.680±0.003 R_{J} |
| d | 2.4±0.6 M_{J} | 26.0+2.2 −6.1 | 91+18 −27 | 0.10+0.12 −0.10 | 89.0+0.7 −0.6 | 1.26±0.03 R_{J} |

The motion of Beta Pictoris b. The orbital plane is viewed side-on; the planet is not moving towards the star.

==== Beta Pictoris b ====
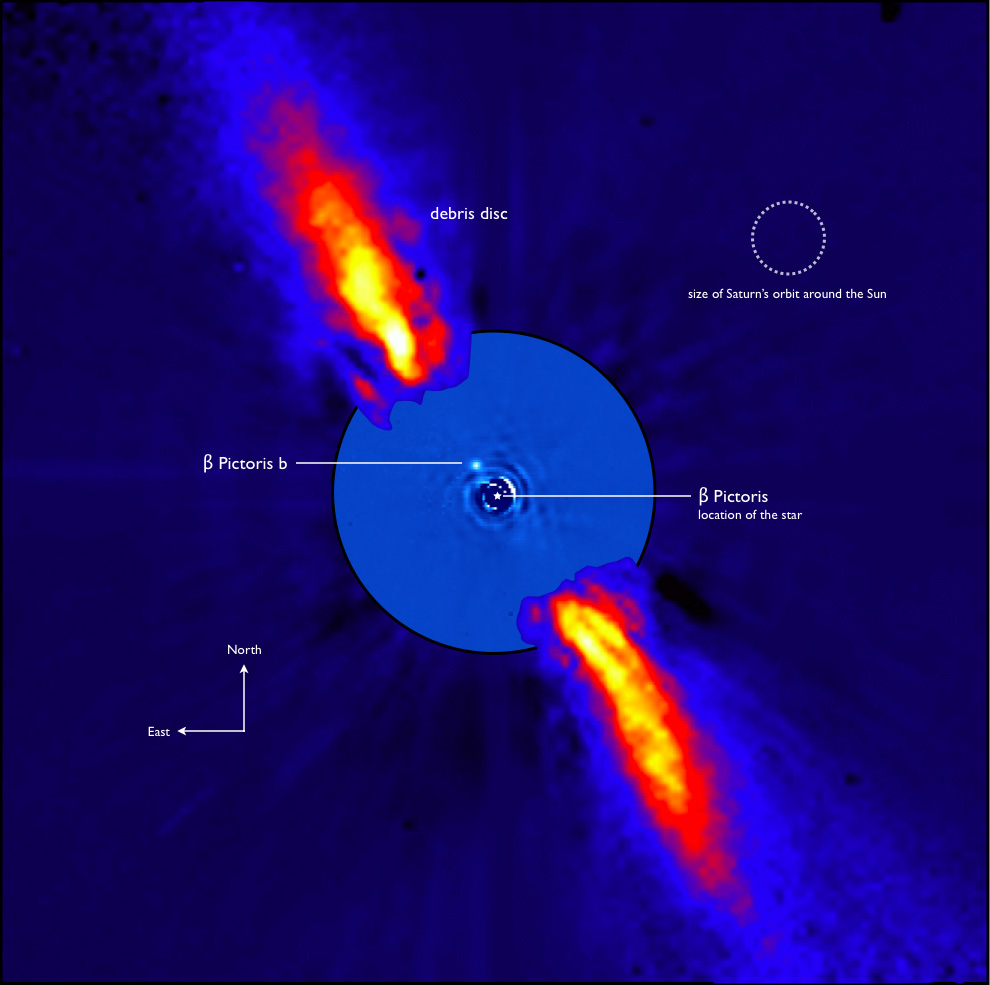
ESO image of a planet near Beta Pictoris

Multiple lines of evidence suggested the existence of a massive planet orbiting in the region around 10 AU from the star: the dust-free gap between the planetesimal belts at 6.4 AU and 16 AU suggest this region is being cleared out; a planet at this distance would explain the origin of the falling evaporating bodies, and the warps and inclined rings in the inner disk suggest a massive planet on an inclined orbit is disrupting the disk.

On November 21, 2008, it was announced that infrared observations made in 2003 with the Very Large Telescope had revealed a candidate planetary companion to the star. The object was observed at an angular distance of 411 milliarcseconds from Beta Pictoris, which corresponds to a distance in the plane of the sky of 8 AU. For comparison, the orbital radii of the planets Jupiter and Saturn are 5.2 AU and 9.5 AU respectively. In the autumn of 2009 the planet was successfully observed on the other side of the parent star, confirming the existence of the planet itself and earlier observations. The orbit has a semimajor axis of 10.1 au and has a low but non-zero eccentricity.

While the orbit of Beta Pictoris b is close to edge-on, a campaign to detect transits of the planet or of material within its Hill sphere during the 2017–2018 transit did not observe any photometric variations. This also ruled out the association between the planet and a "transit-like event" which was observed in November 1981, close to the time the planet was expecting to be transiting.

==== Beta Pictoris c ====
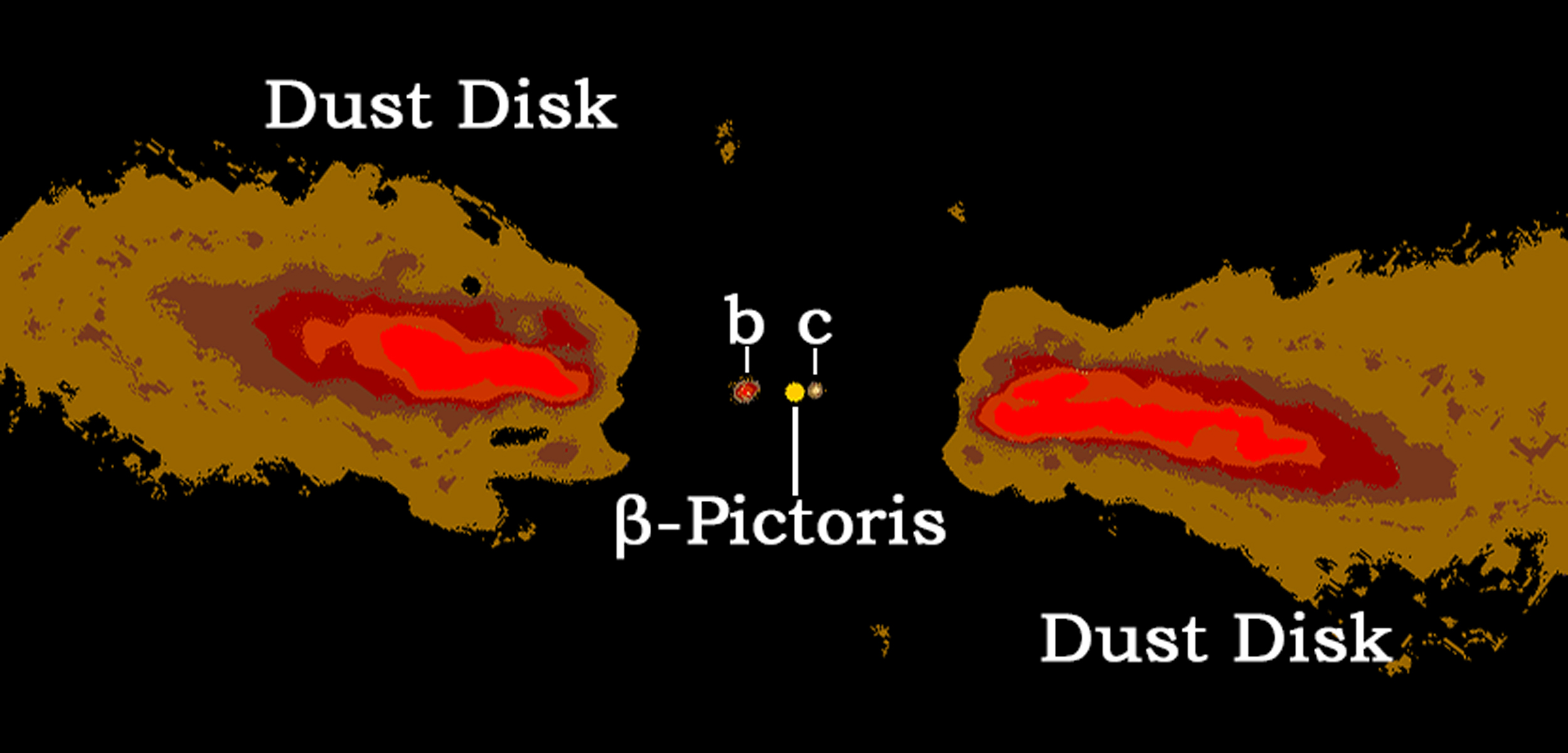
Artistic rendering of the Beta Pictoris system, showing accretion disk and Beta Pictoris b and Beta Pictoris c.

In 2019, the European Southern Observatory discovered the planet Beta Pictoris c using radial velocity measurements from the HARPS spectrograph, and successfully imaged the planet with the GRAVITY interferometric instrument a year later. Beta Pictoris c is orbiting in the plane of the debris disk surrounding the star. At the time of discovery, it was the closest extrasolar planet to its star ever photographed: the observed separation is roughly the same as the distance between the asteroid belt and the Sun. The planet has a temperature of 1250±50 K and a dynamical mass of 8.89±0.75 M_{J}. It has an orbital period of about 3.3 years (1,200 days) and a semimajor axis of 2.7 AU, about 3.5 times closer to its parent star than Beta Pictoris b. The orbit of Beta Pictoris c is moderately eccentric, with an eccentricity of 0.307.

This planet presents data with conflict with current, as of 2020, models for planetary formation. β Pic c is at an age where planetary formations is predicted to occur via disk instability. However the planet orbits at a distance of 2.7 AU, which prediction says is too close for disk instability to occur. The low apparent magnitude, of M_{K} = 14.3±0.1, suggests that it formed via core accretion.

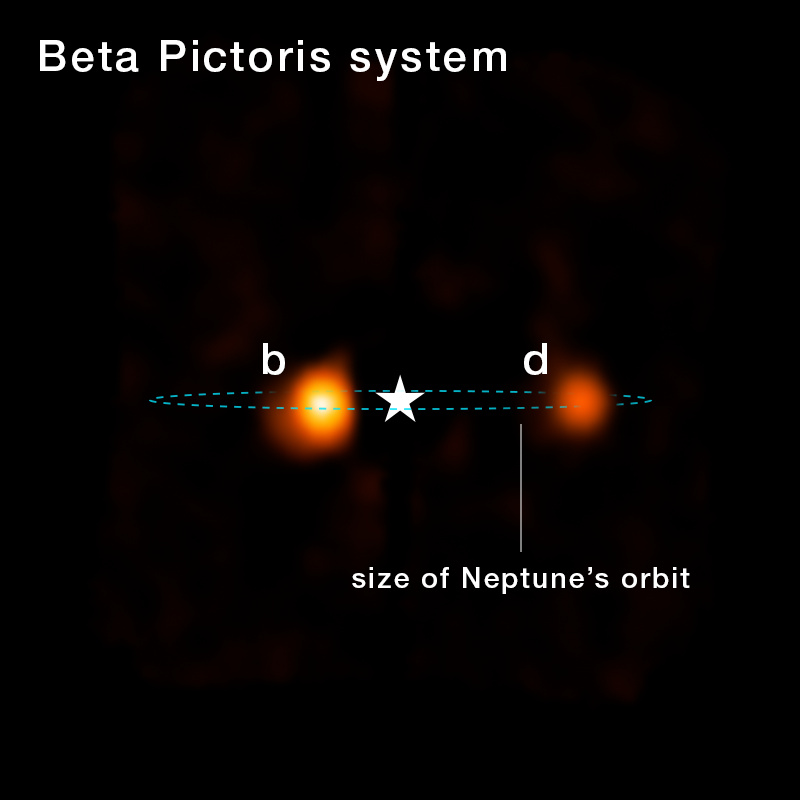
Beta Pictoris d (right) and Beta Pictoris b (left) imaged by JWST

==== Beta Pictoris d ====
Existence of an additional smaller planet on a wider orbit, close to the inner edge of the disk, had been proposed to explain the observed inner debris disk edge at 50 AU, which does not match the dynamical simulation results for the two-planet model. A planet of mass in the range of 0.15–1 M_{J} on a low-eccentricity orbit between 30 and 36 AU would remain below the observational limit for direct observation, but can reproduce the observed disk profile in simulation.

Beta Pictoris d was discovered simultaneously via direct imaging in 2026 by two independent teams, one using the ERIS instrument at the VLT and other archival imaging, and one using the JWST NIRSpec integral field unit. Analysis of archival VLT and JWST data detected the planet in observations as far back as 2014, but showed that Beta Pictoris d had been visually very close to the star or Beta Pictoris b in past observations, potentially delaying its detection. The JWST NIRSpec discovery of Beta Pictoris d is the first time moderate-resolution spectroscopy has been used to aid in the direct imaging discovery of a planet. It has an estimated mass of 2.4±0.6 M_{J}, a radius of 1.26±0.03 R_{J}, a temperature of 600+45
−60 K, and a semi-major axis of 26.0+2.2
−6.1 AU. Its orbit indicates that it may be responsible for sculpting the inner edge of the debris disk. The planet's red color indicates strong carbon dioxide (CO_{2}) absorption in the atmosphere and enhanced metallicity relative to free-floating objects. Absorption features of methane, carbon monoxide, and water have also been detected.

== Dust stream ==
In 2000, observations made with the Advanced Meteor Orbit Radar facility in New Zealand revealed the presence of a stream of particles coming from the direction of Beta Pictoris, which may be a dominant source of interstellar meteoroids in the Solar System. The particles in the Beta Pictoris dust stream are relatively large, with radii exceeding 20 micrometers, and their velocities suggest that they must have left the Beta Pictoris system at roughly 25 km/s. These particles may have been ejected from the Beta Pictoris debris disk as a result of the migration of gas giant planets within the disk and may be an indication that the Beta Pictoris system is forming an Oort cloud. Numerical modeling of dust ejection indicates radiation pressure may also be responsible and suggests that planets farther than about 1 AU from the star cannot directly cause the dust stream.

== See also ==
- 51 Ophiuchi
