= Zeta Doradus =

Star in the constellation Dorado

- Location of Zeta Doradus (circled)

Observation data Epoch J2000.0 Equinox ICRS
- Constellation: Dorado
- ζ Dor A
- Right ascension: 05^{h} 05^{m} 30.65618^{s}
- Declination: −57° 28′ 21.7289″
- Apparent magnitude (V): 4.708
- ζ Dor B
- Right ascension: 05^{h} 05^{m} 47.37235^{s}
- Declination: −57° 33′ 13.7974″
- Apparent magnitude (V): 8.932

Characteristics

ζ Dor A
- Spectral type: F7V
- B−V color index: 0.526±0.011

ζ Dor B
- Spectral type: K7V
- B−V color index: 1.386±0.012

Astrometry

ζ Dor A
Radial velocity (R_{v})	−1.15±0.22 km/s
Proper motion (μ)	RA: −32.140 mas/yr Dec.: 117.417 mas/yr
Parallax (π)	86.0239±0.1516 mas
Distance	37.91 ± 0.07 ly (11.62 ± 0.02 pc)
Absolute magnitude (M_{V})	4.38

ζ Dor B
Radial velocity (R_{v})	−0.88±0.16 km/s
Proper motion (μ)	RA: −32.784 mas/yr Dec.: 119.633 mas/yr
Parallax (π)	85.4852±0.0254 mas
Distance	38.15 ± 0.01 ly (11.698 ± 0.003 pc)

Details

Zeta Dor A
Mass	1.02+0.06 −0.04 M_{☉}
Radius	1.10±0.02 R_{☉}
Luminosity	1.57±0.07 L_{☉}
Habitable zone inner limit	0.89 AU
Habitable zone outer limit	2.07 AU
Surface gravity (log g)	4.430±0.050 cgs
Temperature	6,152±48 K
Metallicity [Fe/H]	−0.21±0.07 dex
Rotational velocity (v sin i)	15.4±0.8 km/s
Age	580 Myr

ζ Dor B
Mass	0.53 M_{☉}
Radius	0.61+0.05 −0.03 R_{☉}
Luminosity	0.084 L_{☉}
Temperature	4,750±340 K

Other designations
- ζ Dor, Zet Dor, FK5 189, HD 33262, HR 1674, SAO 233822, WDS 05055-5728
- ζ Dor A: CPD−57°735, GJ 189, HIP 23693
- ζ Dor B: CPD−57°737, GJ 1075, HIP 23708

Database references
SIMBAD	ζ Dor A
- ζ Dor B

Zeta Doradus is a young star system in the southern constellation of Dorado. Its name is a Bayer designation that is Latinized from ζ Doradus and abbreviated Zeta Dor or ζ Dor. Based on parallax measurements, it lies approximately 38 light-years away. The system consists of two widely separated stars, with the primary being bright enough to be observed with the naked eye but the secondary being much a much fainter star that requires telescopic equipment to be observed.

== Components ==
Zeta Doradus A is a bright, high-proper-motion star with a spectral type of F7V, meaning that it is a main-sequence star that is hotter and brighter than the Sun. With an apparent magnitude of 4.71, it is approximately the eighth-brightest star in the constellation of Dorado.

Though it has been known that Zeta Doradus B is a nearby star since at least the Gliese Catalogue of Nearby Stars, the connection that it is a common proper motion companion to Zeta Doradus A was only made much more recently thanks to Hipparcos satellite data. The two stars form a wide binary, with a physical separation between the components of about 0.018 parsecs (0.06 light-years) which is approximately 3,700 AU. This is comparable to the 15,000 AU separation between Alpha Centauri AB and Proxima Centauri.

Both components of the system show considerable activity: the log R'_{HK} of the stars are -4.373 and -4.575, respectively, whereas a star is "quiet" when it has a Log R'_{HK} of <-4.8. This indicates that the system is young; indeed, the estimated age for Zeta Doradus A is only 0.58 billion years, about an eighth of the solar age.

It is not unusual for a young star to possess a debris disk; Zeta Doradus A is no exception, as it has been found to have an infra-red excess indicative of a disk of small bodies like comets re-emitting absorbed light at a redder wavelength. For Zeta Doradus A, the dust disk has a luminosity of 6.0 × 10^{−6} times the solar luminosity and a temperature of 91±12 K, indicating that it lies at a separation of several AU.

== Planet searches ==
Stars of early spectral type (>F8) are often ignored by radial velocity (RV)-based planet searches due to issues with precision: their high temperature decreases the depth of their spectral lines and they tend to be fast rotators, which broadens their spectral lines. Still, it is still sometimes possible to reach levels of precision capable of the detection of planets in AF-type stars, so Zeta Doradus A was included in a sample early-type stars observed with HARPS. The star was found to be RV-stable to 17 m/s with internal uncertainties of 3 m/s, which indicates that the star does not have any close-in high-mass companions, but does not preclude the presence of sub-Jovian-mass planets.

In 2025, it was noted that the primary star presents a difference on proper motion measurements taken by the Hipparcos and Gaia spacecrafts, suggesting the presence of an orbiting giant planet.
