= Anne-Marie Lagrange =

French astronomer

- Born: March 12, 1962; Rhône-Alpes
- Awards: CNRS Bronze Medal (1994) Irène Joliot-Curie Prize (2011) Member of the French Academy of Sciences (2013) National Order of Merit (France) (2015)
- Scientific career
- Fields: Astrophysics
- Institutions: European Southern Observatory; Laboratoire d'astrophysique de Grenoble; Institut national des sciences de l'univers; Paris Observatory; Paris Sciences et Lettres University

Anne-Marie Lagrange, born March 12, 1962 in the Rhône-Alpes region of France, is a French astrophysicist. Lagrange's work focuses on the research and study of extrasolar planetary systems. Lagrange is the holder of numerous scientific awards and honorary decorations, including Knight of the Legion of Honour (the highest French order of merit) and is a member of the French Academy of Sciences since 2013.

== Early life and education ==
Anne-Marie Lagrange was born on 12 March 1962 in the Rhône-Alpes region where her father was employed at the French electric utility company, Électricité de France S.A. and a stay-at-home mother. When she was 5 years old, her father was transferred to Ain and the family moved to Ceyzérieu where Lagrange went to primary school. She attended college in Culoz, at the Lycée du Bugey in Belley. In high school, she was passionate about physics and mathematics and decided to study higher. On the advice of her teacher and the local Rotary Club, she went to Classe préparatoire aux grandes écoles (CPGE) after obtaining her Baccalauréat in 1979. She discovered the professions of scientific research and thus found her vocation.

In 1982, she joined the École Polytechnique and did her military service for the first year as section chief in the 8th Signal Regiment. She discovered astrophysics during an optional course given by Jean Audouze and found this discipline fascinating—connecting basic sciences with an exploratory side. At school, she gave birth to her first child. She graduated from École Polytechnique in 1985. The following year, she obtained a diploma of in-depth studies (DEA) in astrophysics at Paris Diderot University. Then, she prepared a thesis at the Institut d'astrophysique de Paris under the supervision of Alfred Vidal-Madjar and obtained her doctorate in 1989.

== Career ==
After her studies, Anne-Marie Lagrange did a year of postdoctoral work at the European Southern Observatory (ESO) in Germany from 1989 to 1990. During a mission to Chile, she met Pierre Léna who developed adaptive optics and understands its full potential in the research and study of exoplanets. In 1990, she joined the Laboratoire d'astrophysique de Grenoble (LAOG) under the direction of Alain Omont and formed a small research group on extrasolar planetary systems. In 1994, she obtained her qualification to direct research while she has already been, since 1990, research fellow at the CNRS. From 1997 to 2002, she was the scientific manager of the NAOS instrument, the first adaptive optics installed on the Very Large Telescope (VLT) of the European Southern Observatory. In 2002–2003, she conducted the pre-study of the Spectro-Polarimetric High-Contrast Exoplanet Research (SPHERE instrument), successor to NAOS, dedicated to the research and characterization of exoplanets.

From 1999 to 2003, she was a part-time project manager at the Institut National des Sciences de l'Univers (INSU) and the Department of Universe Sciences at the French National Centre for Scientific Research, while continuing her research at LAOG. In 2000, she became the research director at CNRS. From 2004 to 2006, she was deputy director at INSU and CNRS, responsible for the Astronomy and Astrophysics division. From 2007, she was again a researcher at LAOG, which in 2011 became the Grenoble Institute of Planetology and Astrophysics (IPAG)., before integrating the Paris Observatory in 2020.

In addition to her research, she was a member of several scientific program committees of the Very Large Telescope (VLT), the European Southern Observatory (ESO), the European Space Agency (ESA) and the CNRS. She was also a member of several boards of directors such as the Observatoire de la Côte d'Azur (OCA), THEMIS, EISCAT and the Institut d'astrophysique de Paris, she chaired the High Scientific Council of the Paris Observatory (2014–2017).

She was made a knight of the National Order of the Legion of Honor on April 2, 2010, and promoted to the rank of officer on July 13, 2019, and was appointed to the rank of officer of the Order of Merit on November 20, 2015. She was elected member of the Academy of Sciences on December 10, 2013. She was appointed to the Strategic Research Council on February 3, 2014.

== Work ==
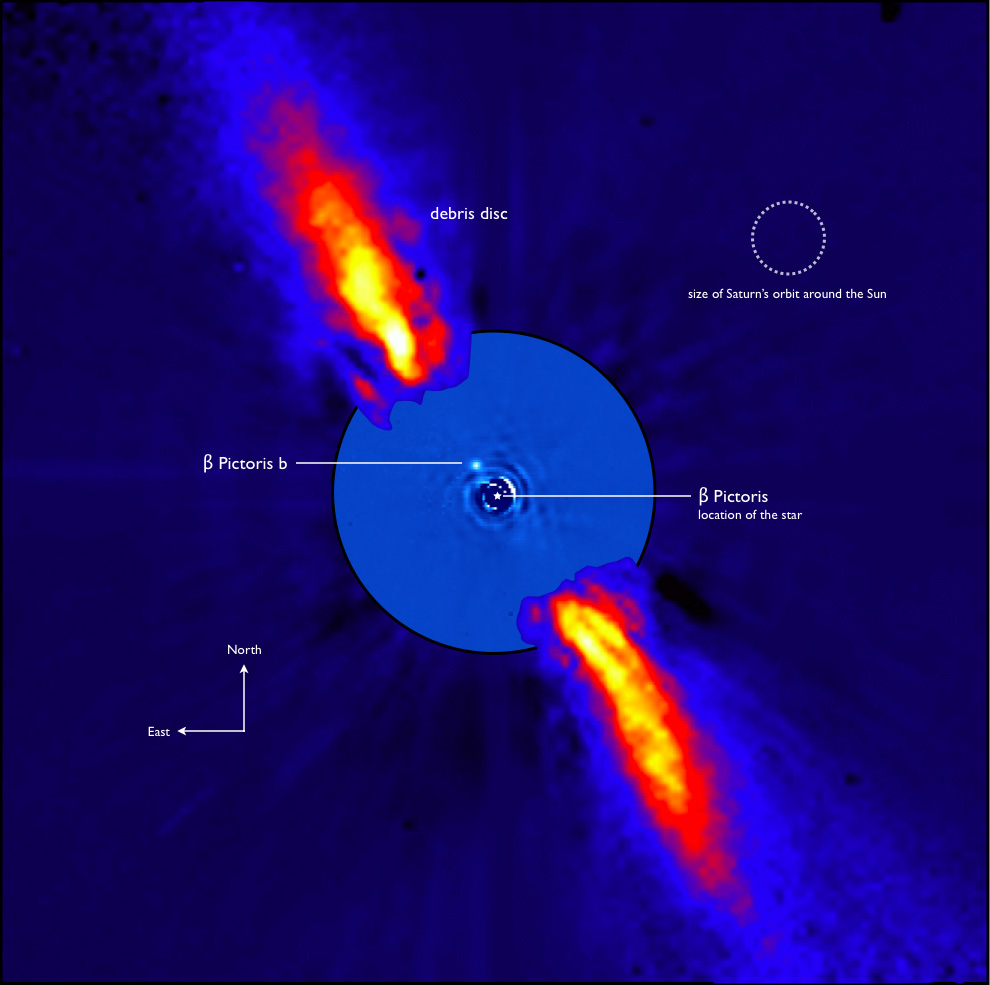
Composite image of the Beta Pictoris system as visualised in infrared

From the 1990s, she began to search for exoplanets using direct imaging using novel adaptive optics. In the 2000s, her research became focused on the study of giant planets around young stars. In the 2000s, she specifically looked for giant planets around young stars. Thus, in 2005, she made the first direct observation of an exoplanet around a brown dwarf using deep adaptive-optics. In this research, she also uses the radial velocity method and extends this technique to other types of stars. In addition, she studies the impact of stellar activity on the detectability of planets.

=== Discovery of exoplanet β Pictoris b ===
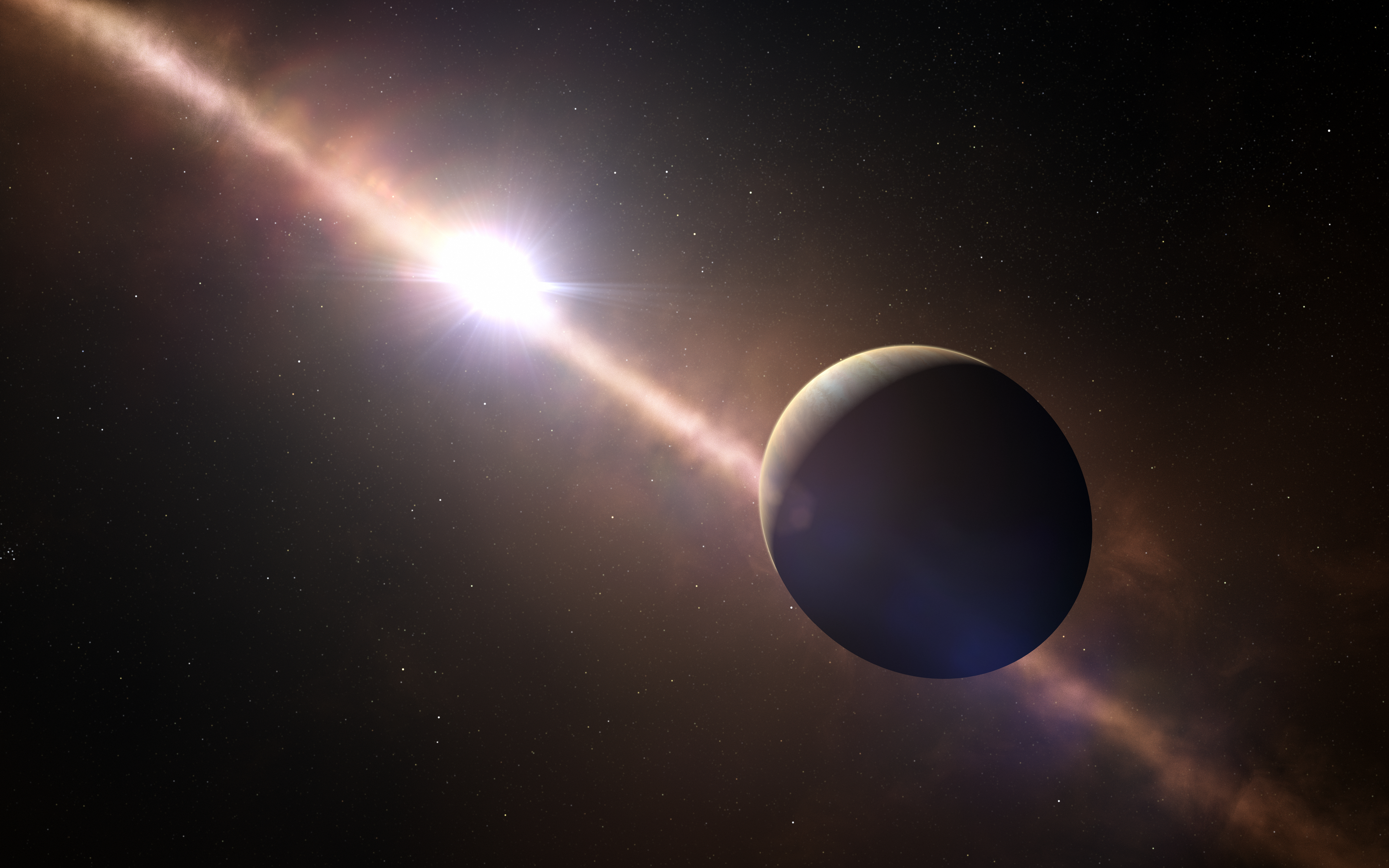
Artist's impression of the planet Beta Pictoris b

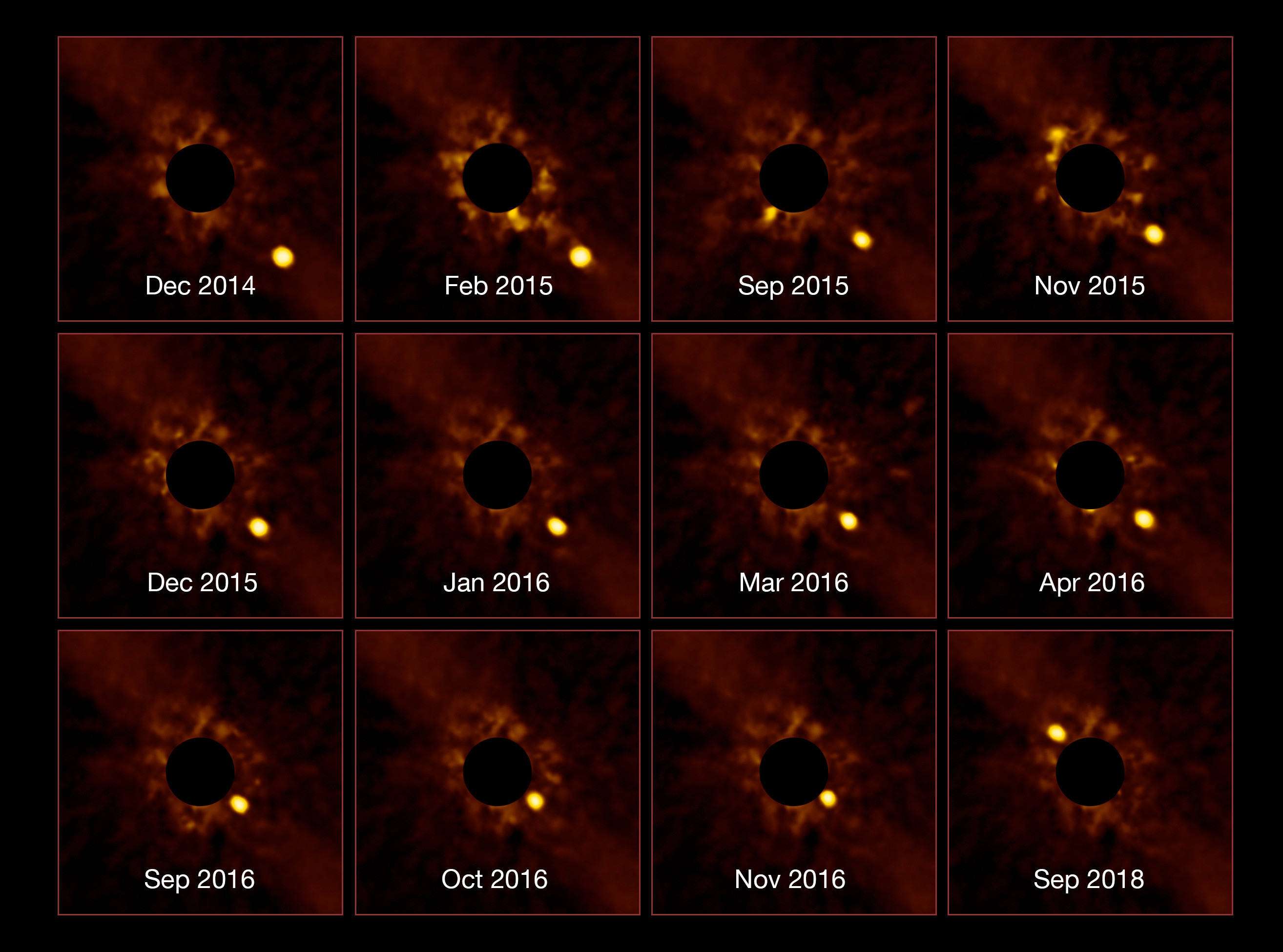
Beta Pictoris b time lapse

Lagrange has devoted much of her career to the analysis of the star Beta Pictoris in the constellation Pictor. During her thesis in the 1980s, she studied the disc of debris that had just been discovered around this star. Several elements indicated the presence of a massive planet—β Pictoris b—but the scientific community remained skeptical. However, in the 2000s, Lagrange made several observations of the debris disc using adaptive optics coupled with direct imaging using a near-infrared spectrometer mounted on the Very Large Telescope (VLT) of the European Southern Observatory (ESO). On November 18, 2008, after processing the data taken in 2003 using reference star differential imaging and modern image processing tools, Lagrange discovered the exoplanet Beta Pictoris b orbiting around the star, confirming her earlier predictions.

=== Giant planet β Pictoris c ===
In 2019, Lagrange and a worldwide team announced the discovery of the giant planet Beta Pictoris c that was equivalent to 9 Jovian masses. Lagrange's team determined that the exoplanet is 23-million-years old, 63.4 light years away, and completes its orbit in approximately 1,200 days. This exoplanet was found using the radial velocity method. The researchers analyzed 10 years of data. The teams were from Lagrange's laboratory at CNRS/Observatoire de la Côte d'Azur and from other French laboratories (Laboratoire d'études spatiales et d'instrumentation en astrophysique, Observatoire de Paris, Sorbonne Université, Université de Paris, Institut d'astrophysique de Paris (Sorbonne Université)) to researchers from the Max Planck Institute for Astronomy, the South African Astronomical Observatory, the University of Warwick, Leiden Observatory, European Southern Observatory, Universidad de Chile, and Universidad de Valparaiso. This new discovery could help scientists better understand the formation of planetary systems and their evolution in the early stages.

== Prizes ==
Lagrange has received a number of prizes during her academic career including:

- CNRS Bronze medal (1994)
- Digital prize of the Société Française d'Astronomie et d'Astrophysique (1997)
- Deslandres prize from the French Academy of Sciences (2003)
- Medal from the Joseph Fourier University (2004)
- Fondation Cino del Duca prize (2005)
- Prize of the French Influence of the association ARRI (2007)
- Dargelos prize of the École Polytechnique (2009)
- Knight of the Legion of Honour (2010)
- Irène Joliot-Curie Prize, female scientist of the year (2011)
- Member of the French Academy of Sciences (2013)
- fr:Trophées des femmes en or, Trophy in the category "Innovation" and Trophy of the public (2013)
- The National Order of Merit (France) (2015)
- Jean-Ricard Prize of the Société française de physique (2017)
- Public school (Ceyzérieu-01) named after her (2018)
- Listed among the 40 Women Forbes (2020/2021)
- Listed among the 50 Women Forbes Europe-Africa-Middle-East (2022)
- Distinguished Visitor STSci "Caroline Herschel Program" (2023–2025)

== Publications ==
Lagrange is the author of numerous scientific publications in peer-reviewed journals and of several books.

- Observer le ciel de nuit, Paris, Nathan, coll. "Carnet du jeune Robinson", 1998 (ISBN 978-2-09-240365-5, notice BnF no FRBNF37026346).
- Fascicule d'astronomie pour les jeunes, Nathan, 1999.
- Les grands observatoires du monde (avec Serge Brunier), Paris, Éditions Bordas, 2002, 240 p. (ISBN 978-2-04-760026-9, notice BnF no FRBNF38967669).
- L'observation en astronomie (avec Pierre Léna et Hervé Dole), Paris, Éditions Ellipses, 2009, 207 p. (ISBN 978-2-7298-4086-0, notice BnF no FRBNF41353630).

== See also ==
- List of women in leadership positions on astronomical instrumentation projects
