= Super-Jupiter =

Class of planets with more mass than Jupiter

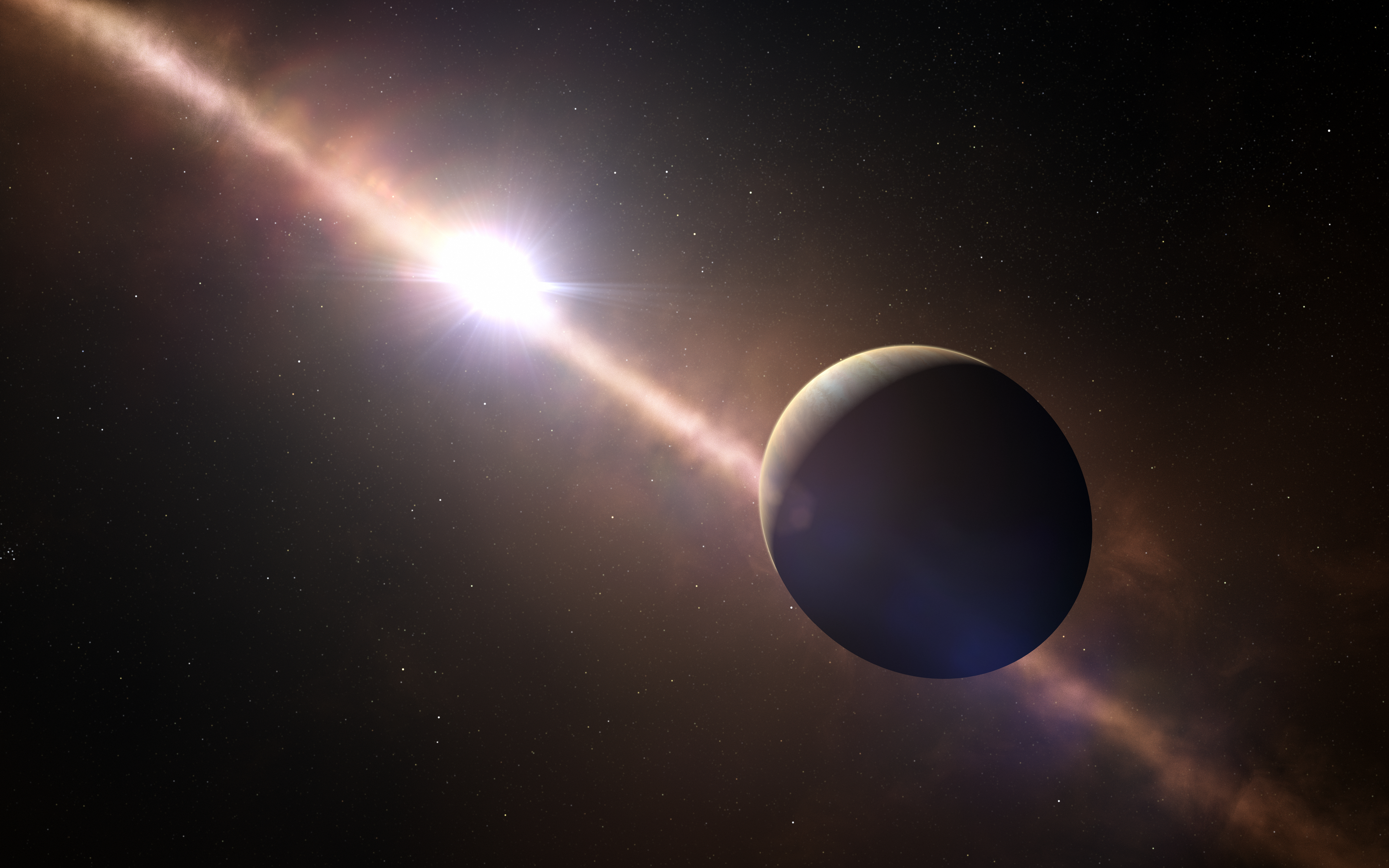
Artist's impression of Beta Pictoris b, a super-Jupiter.

A super-Jupiter, sometimes known as a super-Jovian, is a type of exoplanet significantly more massive than Jupiter. A subset of gas giants, they are the most massive planets, straddling the boundary between giant planets and brown dwarfs.

Due to their great masses, super-Jupiters are relatively luminous when young and cool down slowly. Many are also in distant orbits around their stars. This makes them the easiest planets to detect by direct imaging. Many super-Jupiters have been discovered and studied in this fashion, such as Beta Pictoris b, HR 8799 b, WD 0806-661 b, and Epsilon Indi Ab.

== Definition ==
The term "super-Jupiter" refers to objects considered to be planets that are more massive than Jupiter. Some research papers use it to refer to objects between the mass of Jupiter and 13 Jupiter masses. In other papers, it indicates that the object is "planet-like", having higher metallicity relative to the host star as a result of formation by core accretion, and being more likely to orbit metal-rich stars. Objects more massive than the traditional planet upper mass limit may still be treated as a "planet" under this definition.

The term is sometimes explicitly defined with a range of masses, although there is no single agreed-upon mass range. The lower bound is generally at or greater than 1 Jupiter mass. The upper bound of the mass range is sometimes set at 13 Jupiter masses, but can be lower or higher.

== Characteristics ==
=== Orbit ===
Super-Jupiters tend to have more eccentric orbits than smaller gas giants like Jupiter. A 2026 study found the eccentricity distribution of planets between 1000 and 6000 Earth masses to peak at 0.2-0.4, while smaller planets tend to have more circular orbits. It is not known for certain what mechanisms give rise to this eccentricity distribution; possible candidates include planet-planet scattering and giant impacts, and interactions with the protoplanetary disc.

Unlike less massive gas giants, the occurrence of super-Jupiters do not appear to correlate with super-Earths.

=== Size ===
Neglecting internal heat, high mass gas giants, including super-Jupiters, are expected to remain about the size of Jupiter, as the increased gravitational compression prevents planets from growing larger. Instead, planets more massive than around 3 Jupiter masses are expected to shrink instead.

Many young super-Jupiters, such as Beta Pictoris, are notably larger than Jupiter. Such planets are still radiating internal heat and undergoing Kelvin–Helmholtz contraction.

=== Composition ===
As gas giants, super-Jupiters are primarily composed of hydrogen and helium, with heavier elements making up a small fraction. A giant planet's bulk metallicity, the mass fraction of heavier elements, shows a declining trend with increasing planet mass, as the hydrogen and helium-rich envelope grows in mass relative to a core made of heavier elements. However, the decreasing trend is found to flatten out in the super-Jupiter mass range, and the most massive planets have bulk metallicity of around 3.3±0.5.

=== Atmosphere ===
VHS J1256−1257, a young planet-mass object, exhibits very strong variability. Modelling indicates that its atmosphere exhibits a different atmospheric circulation regime from giant planets in the Solar System as a result of its much hotter atmosphere, negligible stellar flux contribution, and relatively slow rotation. Instead of forming zonal jets, its atmosphere is dominated by patchy clouds and massive dust storms, the latter of which produce the object's observed variability.

== See also ==
- Sub-brown dwarf
- Jupiter analogue
- Hot Jupiter
