= HD 95370 =

Star in the constellation Vela

- Location of HD 95370 (circled in red)

Observation data Epoch J2000 Equinox ICRS
- Constellation: Vela
- Right ascension: 11^{h} 00^{m} 09.2642^{s}
- Declination: −42° 13′ 33.090″
- Apparent magnitude (V): 4.37

Characteristics
- Spectral type: A3 V
- B−V color index: 0.116±0.005

Astrometry
Radial velocity (R_{v})	−3.50±0.50 km/s
Proper motion (μ)	RA: 23.077(64) mas/yr Dec.: 3.942(88) mas/yr
Parallax (π)	16.2011±0.1139 mas
Distance	201 ± 1 ly (61.7 ± 0.4 pc)
Absolute magnitude (M_{V})	0.47

Details
Mass	2.01 M_{☉}
Radius	2.6 R_{☉}
Luminosity	54.77 L_{☉}
Surface gravity (log g)	3.72±0.14 cgs
Temperature	8,696±296 K
Rotational velocity (v sin i)	115 km/s
Age	548 Myr

Other designations
- i Vel, CD−41°6276, FK5 415, HD 95370, HIP 53773, HR 4293, SAO 222487

Database references
SIMBAD	data

HD 95370 is a single star in the southern constellation of Vela. With an apparent visual magnitude of 4.37, it can be viewed with the naked eye. The distance to this star can be determined from its annual parallax shift of 16.2 mas, yielding a value of 201 light years. It is moving closer to the Earth with a heliocentric radial velocity of −3.5 km/s.

According to Houk (1978), this is an A-type main-sequence star with a stellar classification of A3 V. However, Levato (1972) listed a class of A3 IV, which may suggest it is instead a more evolved subgiant star. It is 548 million years years old with a high projected rotational velocity of 115 km/s, giving it an oblate shape with an equatorial bulge that is 5% larger than the polar radius. HD 95370 has double the mass of the Sun and 2.6 times the Sun's radius. It is radiating 55 times the Sun's luminosity from its photosphere at an effective temperature of 8,696 K.
