= HD 83058 =

Binary star system in the constellation Vela

Observation data Epoch J2000 Equinox J2000
- Constellation: Vela
- Right ascension: 09^{h} 34^{m} 08.793^{s}
- Declination: −51° 15′ 18.95″
- Apparent magnitude (V): 5.00

Characteristics
- Evolutionary stage: subgiant
- Spectral type: B2 IV
- U−B color index: −0.97
- B−V color index: −0.19

Astrometry
Radial velocity (R_{v})	+16.5±3.0 km/s
Proper motion (μ)	RA: −130.55 mas/yr Dec.: +42.98 mas/yr
Parallax (π)	3.4252±0.1907 mas
Distance	950 ± 50 ly (290 ± 20 pc)
Absolute magnitude (M_{V})	−2.84

Details

primary
Mass	9.3 M_{☉}
Radius	5.405 R_{☉}
Luminosity	2,686 L_{☉}
Surface gravity (log g)	3.779 cgs
Temperature	17,887 K
Rotational velocity (v sin i)	64±2 km/s
Age	14.1 Myr

secondary
Rotational velocity (v sin i)	24±2 km/s

Other designations
- L Vel, CD−50°4270, FK5 2764, HD 83058, HIP 46950, HR 3819, SAO 237107

Database references
SIMBAD	data

HD 83058 is a subgiant star in the constellation Vela and a spectroscopic binary. It is visible to the naked eye with an apparent visual magnitude of 5.0. Based upon an annual parallax shift of 3.4254 mas, it is located 950 light-years from the Sun. The system is moving further away with a heliocentric radial velocity of +35 km/s.

HD 83058 has generally been considered to be a single star, but high-resolution spectra show it to be a double-lined spectroscopic binary. The two components have approximately the same spectral type. Line-profile variations have been detected which suggest that at least one component pulsates, as is common for stars of this spectral class.

HD 83058 was proposed as a runaway star from a supernova explosion. However, the discovery that it is a binary makes this unlikely.
