= HD 79917 =

Star in the constellation Vela

Observation data Epoch J2000.0 Equinox ICRS
- Constellation: Vela
- Right ascension: 09^{h} 15^{m} 36.7081^{s}
- Declination: −38° 34′ 11.7903″
- Apparent magnitude (V): +4.92

Characteristics
- Spectral type: K1III
- B−V color index: 1.084±0.052

Astrometry
Radial velocity (R_{v})	+1.62±0.14 km/s
Proper motion (μ)	RA: −71.004±0.148 mas/yr Dec.: −10.527±0.186 mas/yr
Parallax (π)	14.3202±0.1227 mas
Distance	228 ± 2 ly (69.8 ± 0.6 pc)
Absolute magnitude (M_{V})	+0.73

Details
Mass	1.8 M_{☉}
Radius	12.63+0.23 −0.36 R_{☉}
Luminosity	66.8±0.7 L_{☉}
Surface gravity (log g)	2.63 cgs
Temperature	4,643+69 −43 K
Metallicity [Fe/H]	+0.12 dex
Rotational velocity (v sin i)	4.28 km/s

Other designations
- l Vel, CD−38°5408, FK5 2737, HD 79917, HIP 45439, HR 3682, SAO 200159

Database references
SIMBAD	data

HD 79917 is a single star in the southern constellation of Vela. It has the Bayer designation l (lowercase L) Velorum, while HD 79917 is the star's identifier from the Henry Draper Catalogue. The star has an orange hue and is faintly visible to the naked eye with an apparent visual magnitude of +4.92. It is located at a distance of approximately 228 light-years from the Sun based on parallax, and is drifting further away with a radial velocity of +1.6 km/s.

This is an aging giant star with a stellar classification of K1III, having exhausted is core hydrogen then cooled and expanded off the main sequence. It has 12.6 times the girth of the Sun and is radiating 67 times the Sun's luminosity from its enlarged photosphere at an effective temperature of 4,643 K.
