= 29 Cygni =

A-type main sequence star in the constellation Cygnus

- Location of 29 Cygni (circled in red)

Observation data Epoch J2000 Equinox ICRS
- Constellation: Cygnus
- Right ascension: 20^{h} 14^{m} 32.03235^{s}
- Declination: +36° 48′ 22.7009″
- Apparent magnitude (V): 4.94 - 4.97

Characteristics
- Evolutionary stage: main sequence
- Spectral type: A2 V
- B−V color index: 0.151±0.018
- Variable type: δ Sct

Astrometry
| Radial velocity (R_{v}) | −17.30±2.80 km/s |
| Proper motion (μ) | RA: +68.391 mas/yr Dec.: +70.446 mas/yr |
| Parallax (π) | 24.5456±0.0724 mas |
| Distance | 132.9 ± 0.4 ly (40.7 ± 0.1 pc) |
| Absolute magnitude (M_{V}) | 1.78 |

Details
| Mass | 1.67–1.75 M_{☉} |
| Radius | 2.32+0.88 −0.20 (equatorial); 1.50+0.15 −0.08 (polar) R_{☉} |
| Luminosity | 10.0+1.7 −0.6 L_{☉} |
| Surface gravity (log g) | 3.37+0.36 −0.85 (equatorial); 4.34+0.05 −0.08 (polar) cgs |
| Temperature | 6,210+755 −1,083 (equatorial); 8,800+75 −103 (polar) K |
| Rotational velocity (v sin i) | 65+6 −7 km/s |
| Age | 30–50 or 119+37 −10 Myr |

Other designations
- b^{3} Cygni, 29 Cyg, V1644 Cygni, BD+36°3955, HD 192640, HIP 99770, HR 7736, SAO 69678, WDS J20145+3648A, 2MASS J20143203+3648225

Database references
| SIMBAD | data |
| Exoplanet Archive | data |

29 Cygni (also widely known as HIP 99770) is a single star in the northern constellation of Cygnus. It is dimly visible to the naked eye as a white-hued star with an apparent visual magnitude of 4.93. The distance to 29 Cyg, as estimated from an annual parallax shift of 24.5 mas, is 133 light years. The star is moving closer to the Earth with a heliocentric radial velocity of −17 km/s.

== Characteristics ==
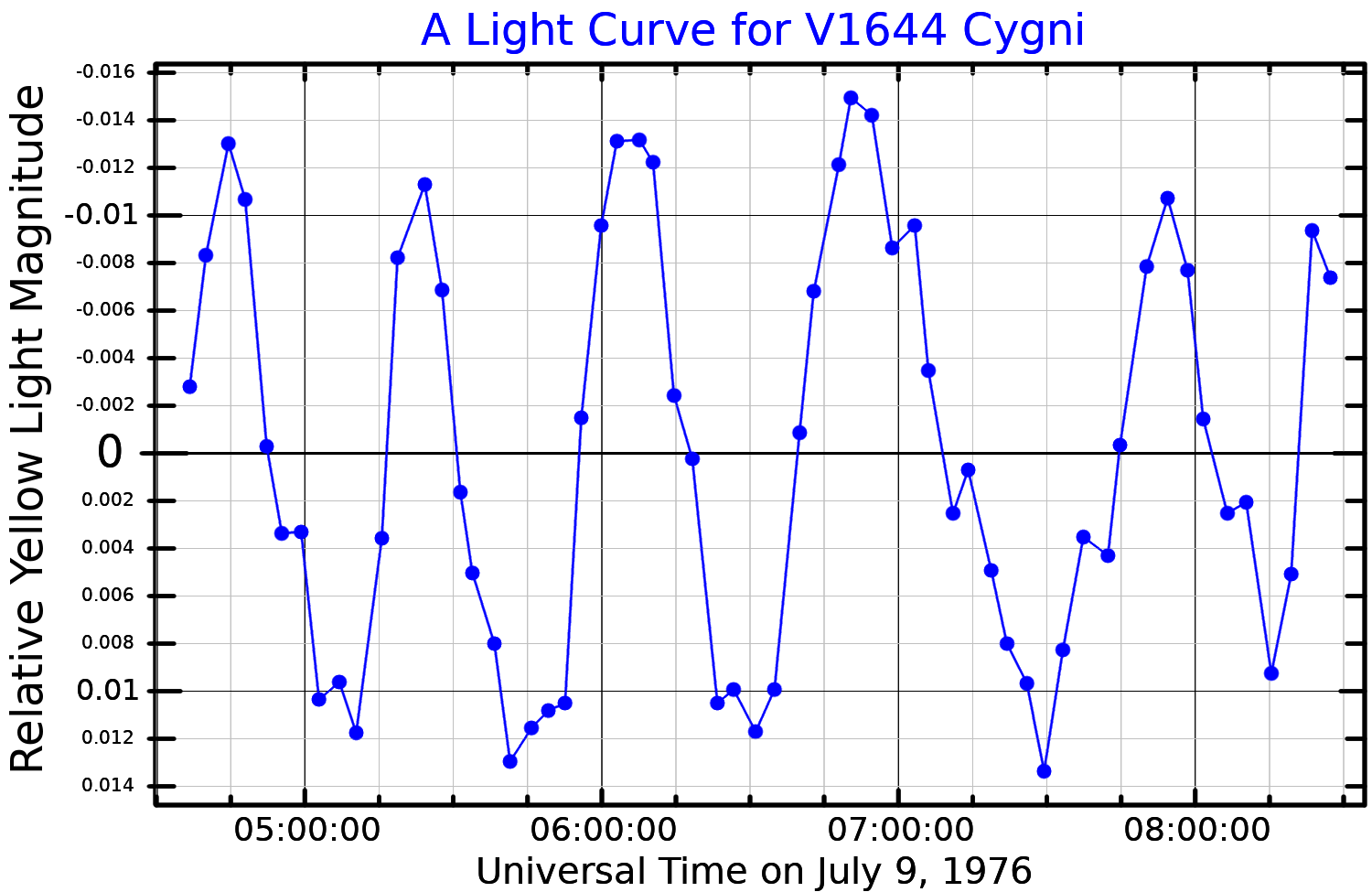
A yellow-light light curve for V1644 Cygni, adapted from Gies and Percy (1977)

29 Cygni is an A-type main-sequence star with a stellar classification of A2 V. Rodríguez et al. (2000) classify it as a Delta Scuti variable with a frequency of 0.0267 cycles per day. It is a Lambda Boötis class chemically peculiar star and the first such star to be classified as a pulsating variable. 29 Cyg is multi-periodic, small-amplitude variable with a maximum brightness change of about 0.02 magnitudes and a dominant period of 39 minutes. A magnetic field has been detected with an averaged quadratic field of (194.5±230.7)×10^{−4} T.

This star has a mass 1.67 to 1.75 times the mass of the Sun and is rotating with a projected rotational velocity (v sin i) of 65 km/s. Interferometric observations show that it is being viewed rotating nearly pole-on, with an axial inclination of either 9.1°+3.5°
−1.3° or 170.9°+3.5°
−1.3°, (Note: The inclination is subject to a 180−i ambiguity, with the prograde value being listed in Table 4.) implying that the rotational velocity at the equator is 414+42
−112 km/s, close to the critical (breakup) velocity of the star. As a consequence, it has an oblate shape, with an equatorial radius of roughly 2.3 solar radii (R_{☉}) and a polar radius of roughly 1.50 solar radii. Due to gravity darkening, the effective temperature also varies across latitudes, being of 6,200 K at the poles and 8,800 K at the equator. The star radiates 10 times the Sun's luminosity from its photosphere.

The age of 29 Cygni has been a matter of debate. Its stellar kinematics indicate that it is a member of the Argus Association at 99 to 99.7% probability, which would place its age between 30 and 50 million years (Myr). On the other hand, Currie et al. (2022) found that the star's position in the Hertzsprung–Russell diagram indicates an age intermediate between the 115 Myr old Pleiades and the 414 Myr old Ursa Major moving group. They considered a scenario of a 29 Cygni being a rotating rapidly star viewed nearly pole-on, which would imply a lower luminosity, and hence a lower age, to be unlikely based on asteroseismic observations, but this was later found to be the case by Balmer et al. in 2026 with interferometry at the CHARA array. The age of the companion HIP 99770 b has been estimated at either 28+15
−14 Myr or 119+37
−10 Myr by comparing its mass and luminosity to the predictions of substellar evolution models.

29 Cygni is listed in multiple star catalogs as having several companions within 4′, including the yellow 7th magnitude HD 192661. All are background objects not physically associated with 29 Cygni itself. The naked-eye stars b^{1} Cygni and b^{2} Cygni, respectively about one and two degrees away, also lie at different distances to 29 Cygni.

== Planetary system ==
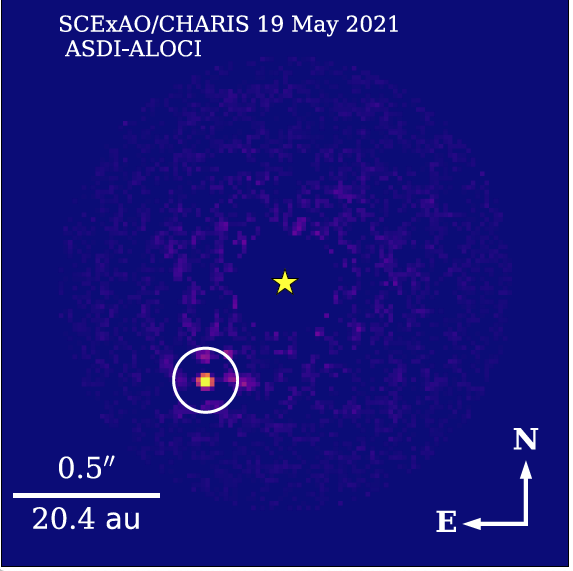
Direct imaging of HIP 99770 b by the Subaru Telescope.

The 29 Cyg system has photospheric near-to-mid infrared colors but exhibits far-infrared excess emission that is about a factor of 13 brighter than the primary's stellar photosphere: evidence for a cold debris disk. The cold debris disk is directly detected in Herschel images. It likely lies at a stellocentric distance greater than 150 au and a luminosity-scaled distance similar to that of the Kuiper belt from the Sun.

The star is orbited by a superjovian planet, HIP 99770 b, which was discovered by direct imaging and astrometry. HIP 99770 b is a late L dwarf (L6 to L9.5) with an estimated temperature of ~1300 K and lies at a luminosity-scaled distance from its star similar to that of Jupiter from the Sun.

The planet's orbital plane is aligned with the spin axis of the star to within 2 sigma (Δi = 12°±6°), comparable to spin-orbit alignments seen for imaged planetary systems like HR 8799, AF Leporis and 51 Eridani. Its spin-orbit alignment and evidence for an enhanced metallicity compared to that of the host star together provide evidence that HIP 99770 b most likely formed in a protoplanetary disk – i.e. a planet-like formation – in a bottom-up process despite its large mass of (13–15)±5 M_{Jup}.

The 29 Cygni planetary system
| Companion (in order from star) | Mass | Semimajor axis (AU) | Orbital period (years) | Eccentricity | Inclination (°) | Radius |
|---|---|---|---|---|---|---|
| b | 13±5 or 15±5 M_{J} | 14.7±0.4 | 47+14 −4 | 0.37±0.03 | 160±5 | 1.20±0.05 or 1.3±0.1 R_{J} |
