= B Cygni =

The Bayer designation b Cygni is shared by three stars in the constellation Cygnus:

- b^{1} Cygni (V2008 Cygni), an RS CVn variable
- b^{2} Cygni (V1624 Cygni), a Be star
- b^{3} Cygni (V1644 Cygni), a δ Scuti variable with a planet companion (HIP 99770 b)

== See also ==
Albireo (β Cygni)
