= A-type main-sequence star =

Stellar classification

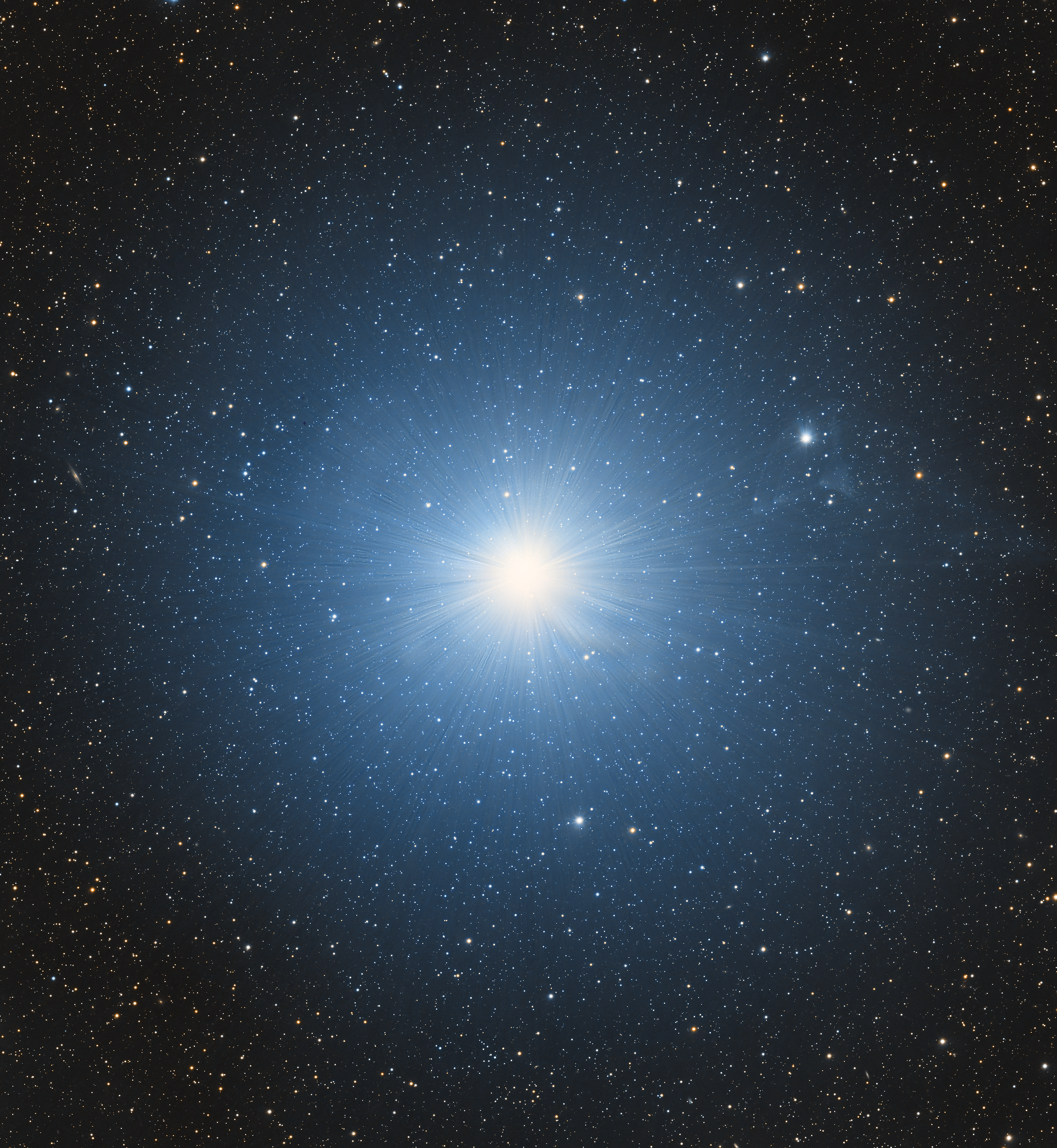
- Vega, the second-brightest star in the northern celestial hemisphere, is an A-type main-sequence star (field of view approx. 1°).

Characteristics
- Type: Class of moderate-large main-sequence star
- Mass range: 1.63–2.33 M_{☉}
- Temperature: 7,400–9,700 K
- Average luminosity: 8–38 L_{☉}

External links
- Media category
- Q471805

An A-type main-sequence star (Note: also called an "A-type dwarf" or "white main-sequence star" to distinguish it from a white dwarf.) is a main-sequence (core hydrogen burning) star of spectral type A. The spectral luminosity class is V. These stars have spectra defined by strong hydrogen Balmer absorption lines. They usually measure between 1.7 and 2.1 solar masses (M_{☉}), have surface temperatures between 7,600 and 10,000 K, and live for about a quarter of the lifetime of the Sun. Bright and nearby examples are Altair (A7), Sirius A (A1) and Vega (A0). A-type stars do not have convective zones and thus are not expected to harbor magnetic dynamos. As a consequence, because they do not have strong stellar winds; they lack a means to generate X-ray emission.

== Spectral standard stars ==
The Morgan-Keenan spectral classification

Properties of typical A-type main-sequence stars
Spectral type	Mass (M_{☉})	Radius (R_{☉})	Luminosity (L_{☉})	Effective temperature (K)	Color index (B − V)
A0V	2.33	2.193	38.37	9,700	0.00
A1V	2.17	2.136	30.76	9,300	0.04
A2V	2.06	2.117	24.21	8,840	0.07
A3V	1.92	1.861	17.06	8,600	0.10
A4V	1.88	1.794	13.43	8,250	0.14
A5V	1.86	1.785	12.36	8,100	0.16
A6V	1.83	1.775	11.12	7,910	0.19
A7V	1.76	1.750	10.00	7,760	0.21
A8V	1.67	1.747	9.12	7,590	0.25
A9V	1.63	1.747	8.24	7,400	0.27

The revised Yerkes Atlas system listed a dense grid of A-type dwarf spectral standard stars, but not all of these have survived to this day as standards. The "anchor points" and "dagger standards" of the MK spectral classification system among the A-type main-sequence dwarf stars, i.e. those standard stars that have remained unchanged over years and can be considered to define the system, are Vega (A0 V), Phecda (A0 V), and Fomalhaut (A3 V). The seminal review of MK classification by Morgan & Keenan (1973) did not provide any dagger standards between types A3 V and F2 V. HD 23886 was suggested as an A5 V standard in 1978.

Richard Gray and Robert Garrison provided the most recent contributions to the A dwarf spectral sequence in a 1987 paper and 1989 paper. They list an assortment of fast- and slow-rotating A-type dwarf spectral standards, including HD 45320 (A1 V), HD 88955 (A2 V), 2 Hydri (A7 V), 21 Leonis Minoris (A7 V), and 44 Ceti (A9 V). Besides the MK standards provided in Morgan's papers and the Gray and Garrison papers, one also occasionally sees Zosma (A4 V) listed as a standard. There are no published A6 V and A8 V standard stars.

== Planets ==
A-type stars are young (typically few hundred million years old) and many emit infrared (IR) radiation beyond what would be expected from the star alone. This IR excess is attributable to dust emission from a debris disk where planets form. Surveys indicate massive planets commonly form around A-type stars although these planets are difficult to detect using the Doppler spectroscopy method. This is because A-type stars typically rotate very quickly, which makes it difficult to measure the small Doppler shifts induced by orbiting planets since the spectral lines are very broad. However, this type of massive star eventually evolves into a cooler red giant which rotates more slowly and thus can be measured using the radial velocity method.

As of early 2011 about 30 Jupiter-class planets have been found around evolved K-giant stars including Pollux, Gamma Cephei and Iota Draconis. Doppler surveys around a wide variety of stars indicate about one in six stars having twice the mass of the Sun are orbited by one or more Jupiter-sized planets, compared to about one in sixteen for Sun-like stars. A-type star systems known to feature planets include HD 15082, Beta Pictoris and HR 8799.

Examples of A-type main-sequence stars with circumstellar disc and exoplanets:

Name	Spectral type	Mass (M_{☉})	Radius (R_{☉})	Disk extent (AU)	Exoplanets
Vega	A0V	2.15	2.73	170 / 815	Vega b (candidate)
Fomalhaut	A3V	1.92	1.84	209	Fomalhaut b (controversial), unnamed candidate
HR 8799	A5V	1.43	1.44	360	HR 8799 b, HR 8799 c, HR 8799 d, HR 8799 e, HR 8799 f (candidate)
Beta Pictoris	A6V	1.75	1.73	1835	Beta Pictoris b, Beta Pictoris c, Beta Pictoris d

== Examples ==
Within 40 light-years:

Name	Spectral type	Constellation	vis Mag	Mass (M_{☉})	Radius (R_{☉})	Luminosity (L_{☉})	Distance (ly)
Sirius	A0mA1 Va	Canis Major	−1.46	2.063	1.713±0.009	24.7±0.7	8.61±0.03
Altair	A7 V	Aquila	0.76	1.86±0.03	2.007 × 1.565	10.6	16.73
Vega	A0 Va	Lyra	0.026	2.15+0.10 −0.15	2.726±0.006 × 2.418±0.008	47.2±0.2	25.04
Fomalhaut	A3 V	Piscis Austrinus	1.17	1.92±0.02	1.842±0.019	16.63±0.48	25.1
Denebola	A3 Va	Leo	2.14	1.78	1.75±0.02	12.9±0.1	35.8

Sirius is the brightest star in the night sky.

== See also ==
- Star count, survey of stars
- B-type main-sequence star
