= 66 Leonis =

A-type star in the constellation Leo

Observation data Epoch J2000 Equinox ICRS
- Constellation: Leo
- Right ascension: 11^{h} 09^{m} 13.6587^{s}
- Declination: −01° 19′ 59.736″
- Apparent magnitude (V): 6.80±0.01

Characteristics
- Evolutionary stage: Main sequence
- Spectral type: A5V

Astrometry
Radial velocity (R_{v})	+12.81±0.30 km/s
Proper motion (μ)	RA: −65.160 mas/yr Dec.: −5.525 mas/yr
Parallax (π)	12.0377±0.0292 mas
Distance	270.9 ± 0.7 ly (83.1 ± 0.2 pc)
Absolute magnitude (M_{V})	2.21

Details
Mass	1.90+0.19 −0.20 M_{☉}
Radius	1.65±0.05 R_{☉}
Luminosity	10.5±0.4 L_{☉}
Surface gravity (log g)	4.30±0.07 cgs
Temperature	8,090±120 K
Age	115+85 −92 Myr

Other designations
- BD−00°2409, HD 96855, HIP 54515, TYC 4921-1206-1

Database references
SIMBAD	data
Exoplanet Archive	data

66 Leonis is a single, white-hued star in the constellation of Leo. With an apparent magnitude of +6.80, it is far too faint to be viewed to the naked eye under normal conditions, and can only be faintly seen in ideal conditions under dark skies. Based on parallax measurements by the Gaia spacecraft, it lies at a distance of 271 light-years (83.1 parsecs). It is moving away from the Sun at a velocity of 12.8 km/s.

The star has a stellar classification of A5V, with the luminosity class V indicating that it is in the main sequence. It is estimated to be 100 million years old, has 1.9 times the mass of the Sun, 1.65 times the Sun's radius, and 10.5 times the Sun's luminosity. The effective temperature is 8,090 K, giving it the typical white hue of an A-type star.

== Planetary system ==
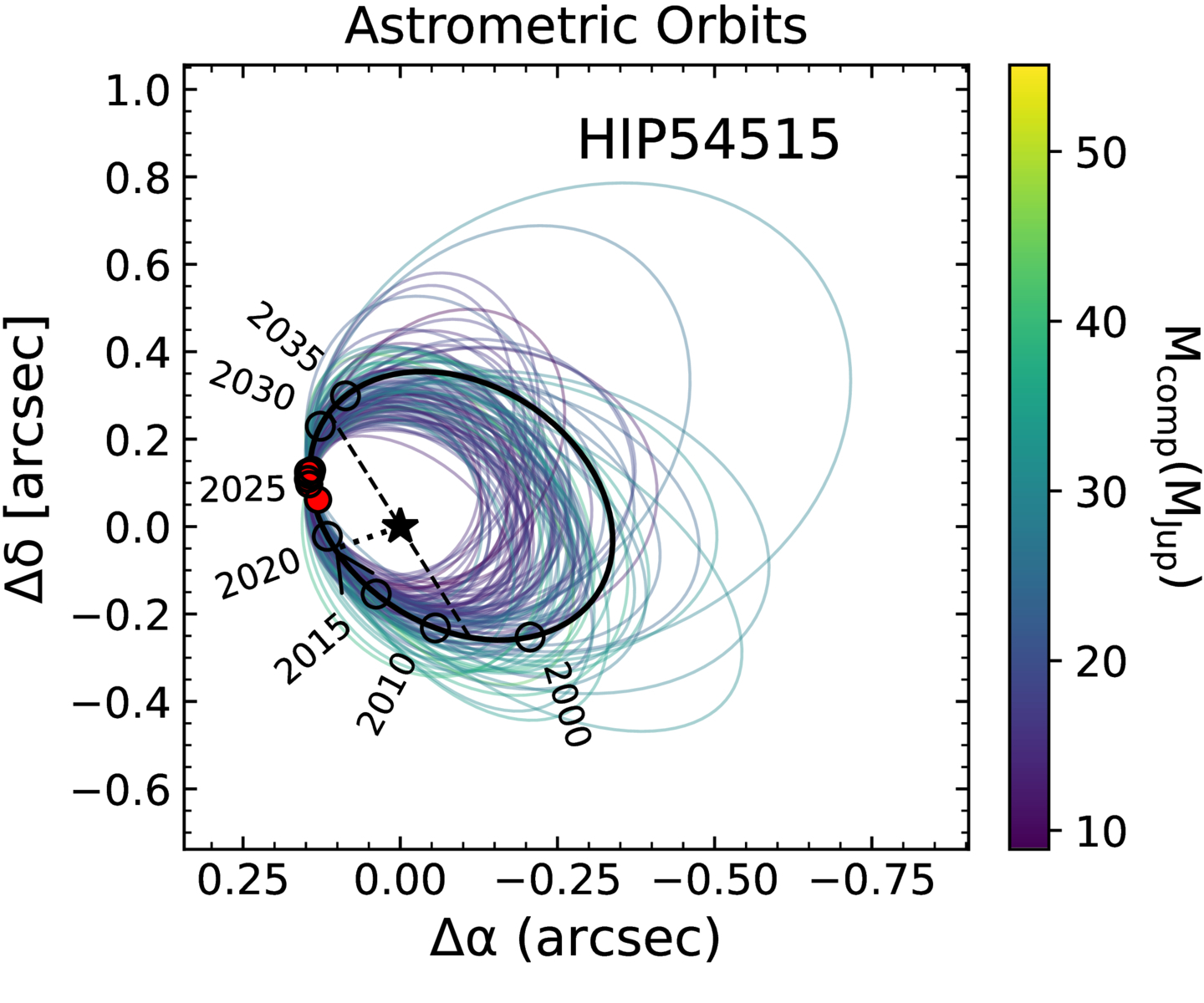
Orbital fit for the planet 66 Leonis b based on astrometry data.

66 Leonis hosts a super-Jupiter exoplanet, discovered combining direct imaging from the CHARIS instrument at the Subaru Telescope and astrometry data from the Hipparcos and Gaia spacecraft. Its discovery was published in 2025, making it the third planet to have been discovered using both direct imaging and astrometry, after AF Leporis b and HIP 99770 b.

The planet has an estimated radius of 1.1 R_{J} and an effective temperature of 2,348±218 K. It takes around 90 years to complete an orbit around 66 Leonis and has a semi-major axis of 25 astronomical units, similar to the distance of Neptune to the Sun (30.1 au). Its mass, estimated from the astrometric observations, is 17.7+7.6
−4.9 M_{J}, which is higher than the traditional boundary between planets and brown dwarfs of 13 M_{J}. Based on this boundary, 66 Leo b would be a brown dwarf, but its position in the mass—semimajor axis diagram and its low mass ratio relative to the host star are similar to that of other planets and discrepant with more massive brown dwarfs, supporting its classification as a planet. Furthermore, the mass required for an object to burn deuterium also depends on its helium abundance, which cannot be reliably measured, and multiple studies have rejected deuterium burning as a delimiter between planets and brown dwarfs based on demographic grounds.

The 66 Leonis planetary system
Companion (in order from star)	Mass	Semimajor axis (AU)	Orbital period (years)	Eccentricity	Inclination (°)	Radius
b	17.7+7.6 −4.9 M_{J}	24.8+7.2 −4.7	89+41 −24	0.42+0.13 −0.14	129.6+6.7 −5.9	1.08±0.23 R_{J}
