= HR 8799 b =

Jovian planet orbiting HR 8799

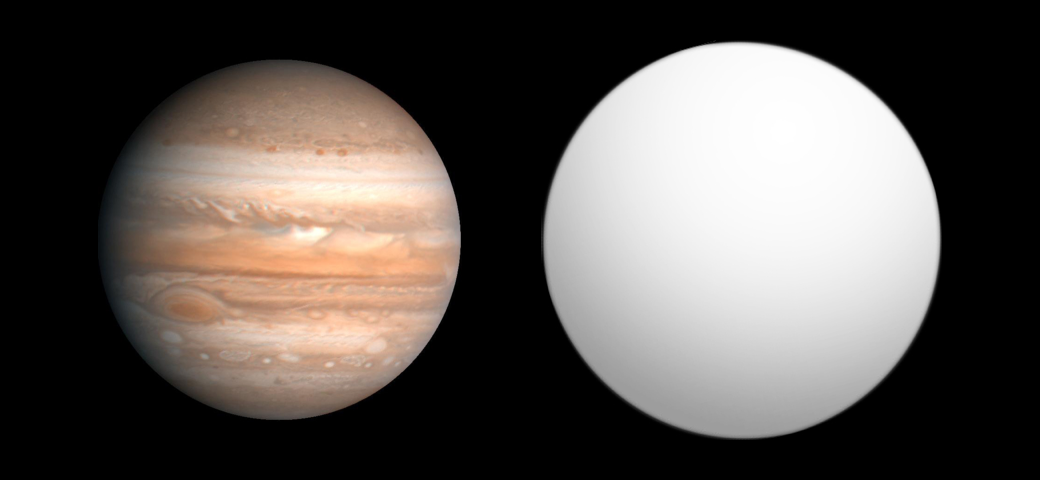
- Size comparison of HR 8799 b (gray) with Jupiter.

Discovery
- Discovered by: Marois et al.
- Discovery site: Keck and Gemini observatories in Hawaii
- Discovery date: November 13, 2008
- Detection method: Direct imaging

Orbital characteristics
- Semi-major axis: 68.79+1.63 −3.64 AU
- Eccentricity: 0.04+0.05 −0.03
- Orbital period (sidereal): 419 years
- Inclination: 26.5±0.5 °
- Longitude of ascending node: 64.29+7.94 −8.00 °
- Argument of periastron: 178.54+50.31 −48.52 °
- Star: HR 8799

Physical characteristics
- Mean radius: 1.10±0.03 R_{J}
- Mass: 4.65+2.80 −2.49 M_{J}
- Mean density: 5.041 g/cm^{3}
- Surface gravity: 10^{4.10+0.03 −0.04} cgs
- Temperature: 942+12 −16 K

Atmosphere
- Composition by volume: hydrogen, water vapor, ammonia and/or acetylene, carbon dioxide, carbon monoxide, possibly with methane

HR 8799 b is an extrasolar planet located approximately 129 light-years away in the constellation of Pegasus, orbiting the 6th magnitude Lambda Boötis star HR 8799. It has a mass of six Jupiter masses and a radius 10% larger than Jupiter's. It orbits at 71.3 AU from HR 8799 with a low ecccentricity and a period of around 419 years, being the outermost known planet in the HR 8799 system.

== Discovery ==
Along with two other planets orbiting HR 8799, the planet was discovered on 13 November 2008 by Marois et al., using the Keck and Gemini observatories in Hawaii. These planets were discovered using the direct imaging technique.

In 2009 it was discovered that the Hubble Space Telescope had in fact directly imaged HR 8799 b eleven years earlier, in 1998, suggesting that more exoplanets might be revealed through analysis of HST photographic archives. Additional precovery images were also obtained by reanalyzing data taken in 2002 at the Subaru Telescope and in 2005 and 2007 at the W. M. Keck Observatory.

== Atmosphere ==
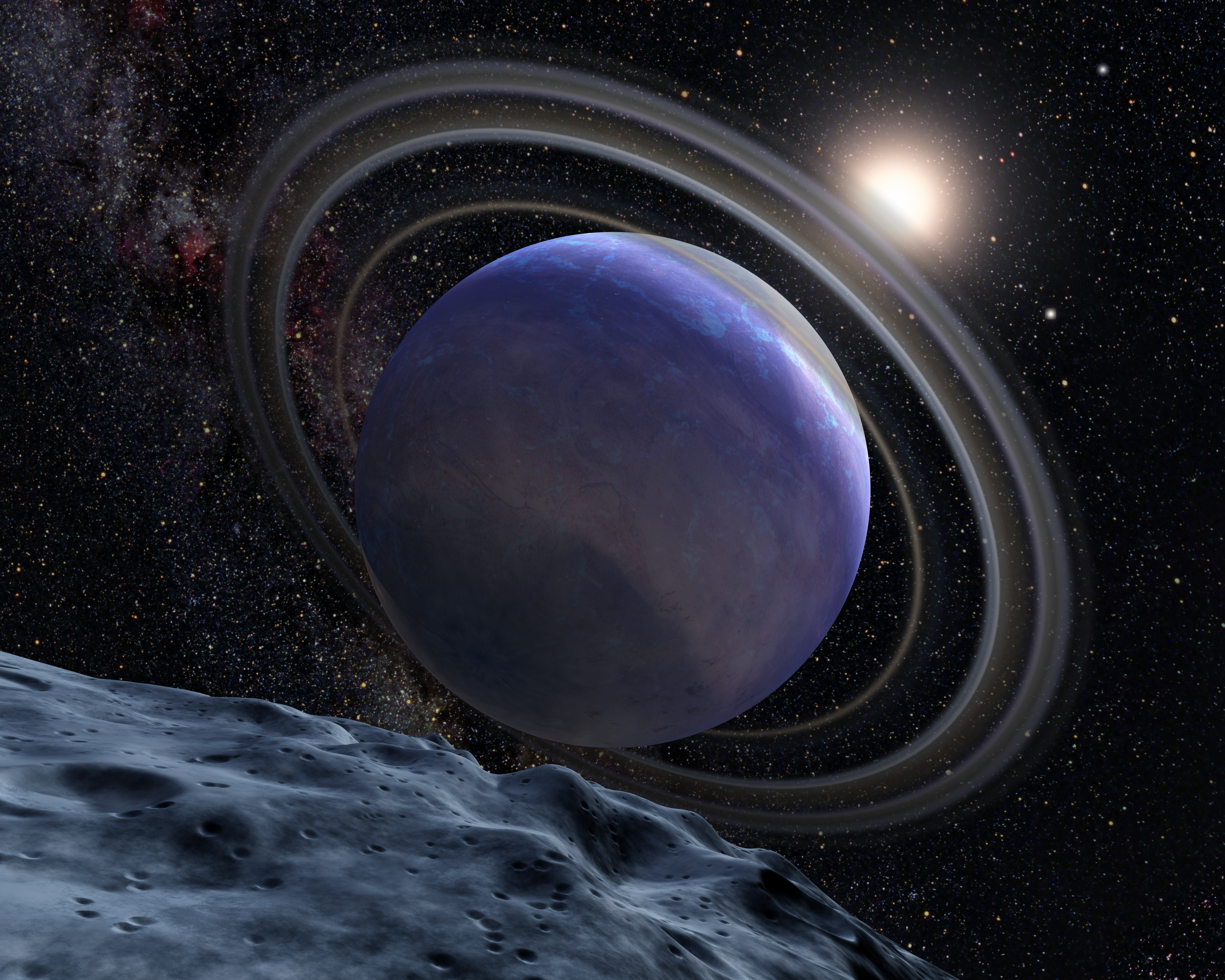
Artistic illustration of HR 8799b.

Broadband photometry of HR 8799 b shows that it has thicker clouds in its atmosphere than do older, higher surface gravity substellar objects of the same effective temperature. Near infrared H band and K band spectroscopy of HR 8799 b published in May 2011 indicate a hydrogen rich, dusty atmosphere with disequilibrium CO / CH_{4} chemistry.

=== Composition ===
Near infrared spectroscopy made with the Palomar Observatory show evidence of ammonia and/or acetylene as well as carbon dioxide, and some methane. In 2015, the signals of water vapor, carbon monoxide and methane were reported in infrared spectra taken at the Keck telescope. However, a reanalysis of the same data in 2018 shows that water and carbon monoxide are present, but that the methane detection may have been spurious. Observations by the James Webb Space Telescope (JWST) will likely be capable of confirming or disproving the presence of methane in HR 8799 b's atmosphere. In 2025, JWST confirmed the presence of carbon dioxide in the planet's atmosphere.
