= HR 8799 d =

Jovian planet orbiting HR 8799

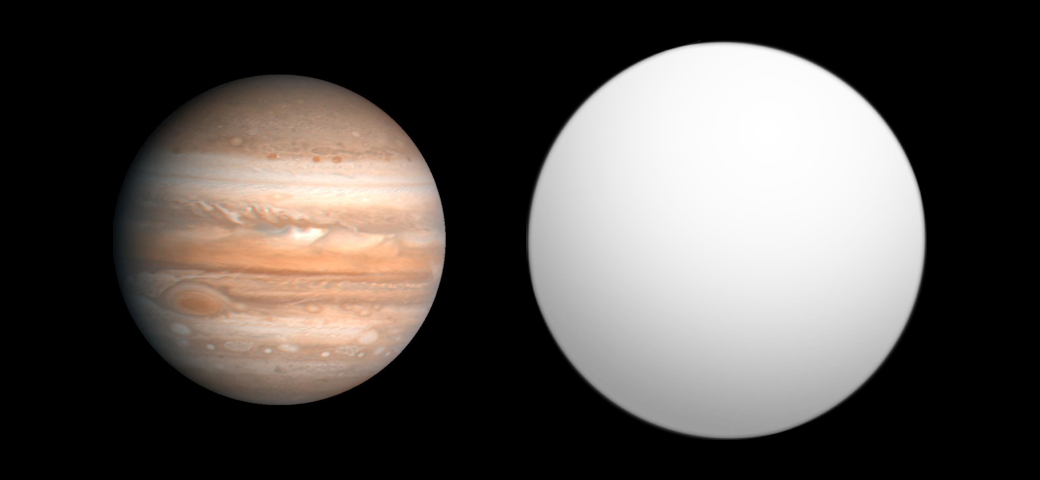
- Size comparison of HR 8799 d (gray) with Jupiter.

Discovery
- Discovered by: Marois et al.
- Discovery site: Keck and Gemini observatories in Hawaii
- Discovery date: November 13, 2008
- Detection method: Direct imaging

Orbital characteristics
- Semi-major axis: 25.85+1.74 −1.59 AU
- Eccentricity: 0.10±0.07
- Orbital period (sidereal): 104.7 years
- Inclination: 28.20+4.64 −6.24 °
- Longitude of ascending node: 65.36+5.89 −6.54 °
- Argument of periastron: 5.54+23.65 −19.84 °
- Star: HR 8799

Physical characteristics
- Mean radius: 1.26±0.07 R_{J}
- Mass: 9.17±2.84 M_{J}
- Mean density: 5.978 g/cm^{3}
- Surface gravity: 10^{4.18±0.05} cgs
- Synodic rotation period: 6.0+11.3 −2.5 h
- Equatorial rotation velocity: ~10.1+2.8 −2.7 km/s
- Temperature: 1179+31 −28 K

HR 8799 d is an extrasolar planet located approximately 129 light-years away in the constellation of Pegasus, orbiting the 6th magnitude Lambda Boötis star HR 8799. It has a mass 9±3 times that of Jupiter and a radius 26% larger than Jupiter's. The planet orbits at 26.67 AU from HR 8799 with an eccentricity of 0.113 and a period of 105 years. Upon initial discovery, it was the innermost known planet in the HR 8799 system, but e, discovered later, is now known to be closer to their parent star. Along with two other planets orbiting HR 8799, this planet was discovered on November 13, 2008 by Marois et al., using the Keck and Gemini observatories in Hawaii. These planets were discovered using the direct imaging technique.

Near infrared spectroscopy from 995 to 1769 nanometers made with the Palomar Observatory show evidence of acetylene, methane, and carbon dioxide, but ammonia is not definitively detected. In 2021, the further detection of water and carbon monoxide in the planetary atmosphere was made with the Keck Planet Imager and Characterizer (KPIC).
