= Vortex coronagraph =

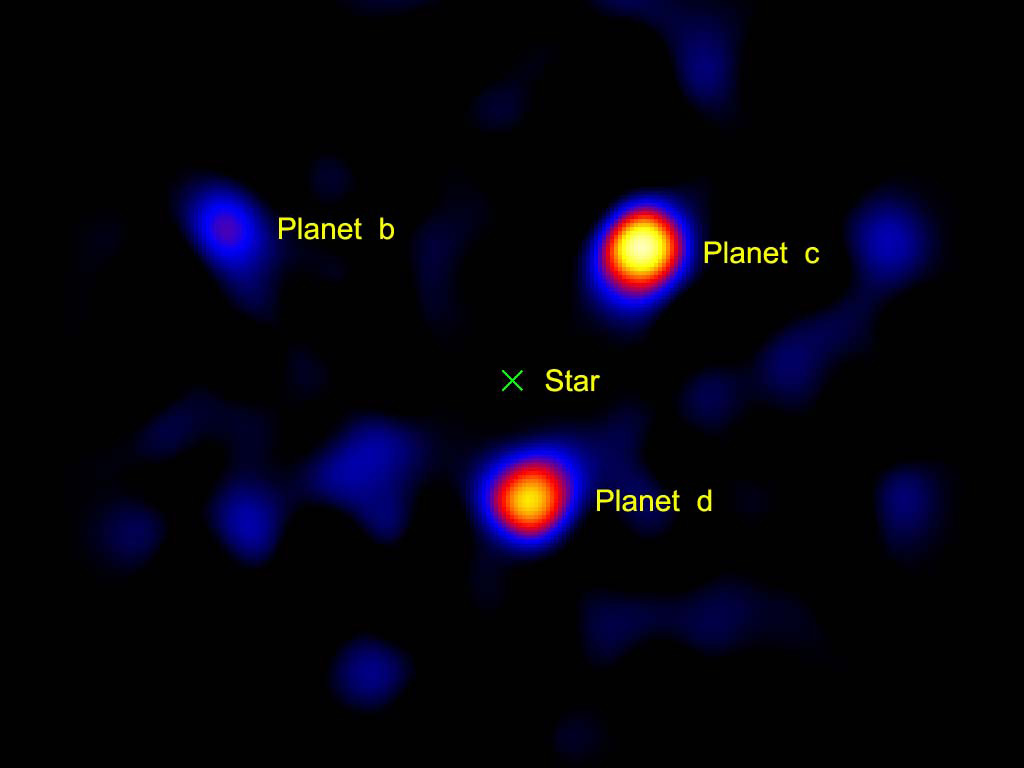
Direct image of exoplanets around the star HR8799 using a vortex coronograph on a 1.5m portion of the Hale Telescope

A vortex coronagraph is a type of optical instrument for telescopes that blocks the glare of stars or other bright objects so that dimmer, nearby objects such as exoplanets can be seen. It is a coronagraph using an optical vortex. Rather than directly blocking the light of stars with a physical mask, it uses optical interference, allowing images to be taken closer to stars than regular coronagraphs allow.

Vortex coronagraphs have been used in conjunction with adaptive optics for astronomy.

== History and usage ==
In 2005 a paper described a method for astronomy, by which the light of a parent star could be blocked, while transmitting the light from nearby dimmer companions (such as exoplanets).

Up until the year 2010, telescopes could only directly image exoplanets under exceptional circumstances. Specifically, it is easier to obtain images when the planet is especially large (considerably larger than Jupiter), widely separated from its parent star, and hot so that it emits intense infrared radiation. However, in 2010 a team from NASAs Jet Propulsion Laboratory demonstrated that a vortex coronagraph could enable small telescopes to directly image planets. They did this by imaging the previously imaged HR 8799 planets using just a 1.5 m portion of the 5 meter Hale Telescope.

A vortex coronagraph was used on the Keck Observatory by 2017. The VC was installed on an infrared camera at Keck, and allowed bodies to be viewed 2–3 times closer to a parent star than before. HIP 79124 B was imaged at a distance of 23 astronomical units from its host star with a vortex coronagraph on the Keck telescope, and it was called a brown dwarf. Next generation VCs are able to dim multiple sources of light. It will be thus possible to use them to image planets around multi-star systems.

== See also ==
- Optical vortex
