= HR 8799 =

Star in the constellation Pegasus

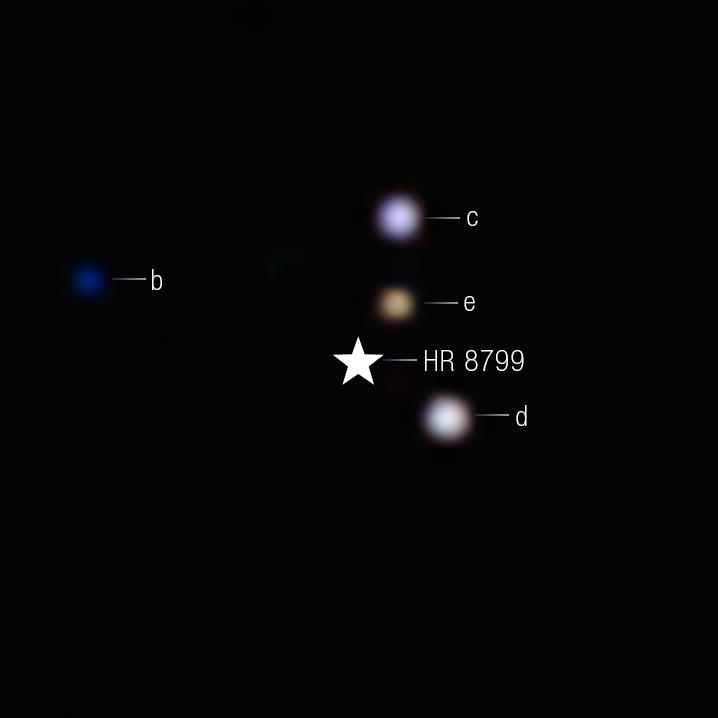
- HR 8799 (marked with star) with HR 8799 planets (indicated) as of 2025 from James Webb Space Telescope

Observation data Epoch J2000.0 Equinox ICRS
- Constellation: Pegasus
- Right ascension: 23^{h} 07^{m} 28.7157^{s}
- Declination: +21° 08′ 03.311″
- Apparent magnitude (V): 5.964

Characteristics
- Evolutionary stage: main sequence
- Spectral type: F0kA5mA5V λ Boo
- U−B color index: −0.04
- B−V color index: 0.234
- Variable type: γ Dor

Astrometry
Radial velocity (R_{v})	−11.5±2 km/s
Proper motion (μ)	RA: +108.29±0.02 mas/yr Dec.: −50.10±0.03 mas/yr
Parallax (π)	24.4620±0.0455 mas
Distance	133.3 ± 0.2 ly (40.88 ± 0.08 pc)
Absolute magnitude (M_{V})	2.98±0.08

Details
Mass	1.52±0.05 M_{☉}
Radius	1.502±0.035 R_{☉}
Luminosity (bolometric)	5.441±0.066 L_{☉}
Surface gravity (log g)	4.35±0.05 cgs
Temperature	7,193±87 K
Metallicity [Fe/H]	−0.52±0.08 (Note: The star is a member of the Lambda Boötis class of peculiar stars, thus the observed abundance may not reflect the abundances of the star as a whole.) dex
Rotational velocity (v sin i)	37.5±2 km/s
Age	42+24 −16 Myr

Other designations
- V342 Pegasi, BD+20°5278, FK5 3850, GC 32209, HD 218396, HIP 114189, SAO 91022, PPM 115157, TYC 1718-2350-1, Gaia DR3 2832463659640297472

Database references
SIMBAD	data
Exoplanet Archive	data

HR 8799 is a roughly 42 million-year-old main-sequence star located 133.3 light-years (40.9 parsecs) away from Earth in the constellation of Pegasus. It has roughly 1.4 times the Sun's mass and 5 times its luminosity. It is part of a system that also contains a debris disk and at least four massive planets. These planets were the first exoplanets whose orbital motion was confirmed by direct imaging. The star is a Gamma Doradus variable: its luminosity changes because of non-radial pulsations of its surface. The star is also classified as a Lambda Boötis star, which means its surface layers are depleted in iron peak elements. It is the only known star which is simultaneously a Gamma Doradus variable, a Lambda Boötis type, and a Vega-like star (a star with excess infrared emission caused by a circumstellar disk).

== Location ==
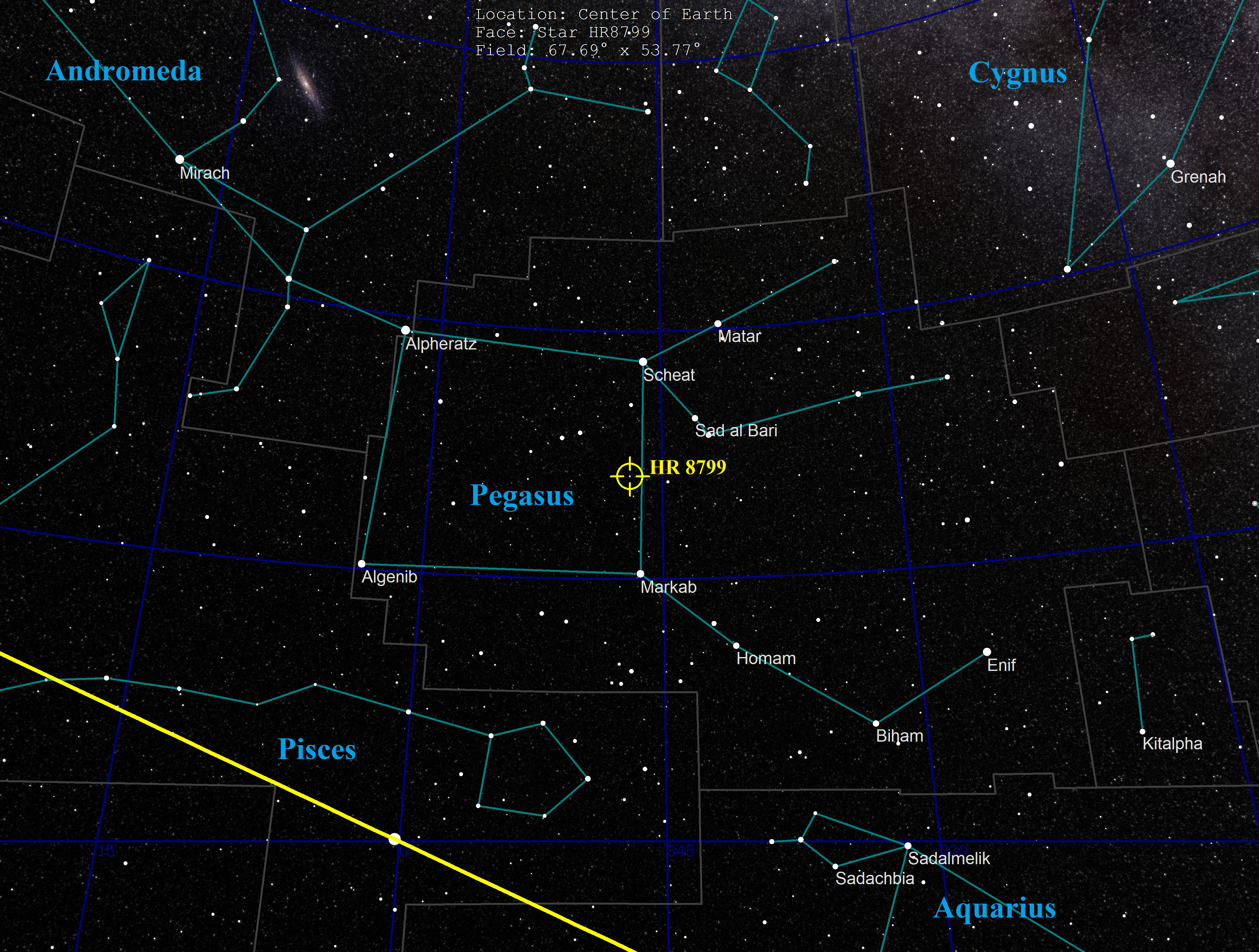
Location of HR 8799

HR 8799 is a star that is visible to the naked eye with sufficiently dark skies. It has a magnitude of about 6.0, varying by a few hundredths of a magnitude, and it is located inside the western edge of the great square of Pegasus almost exactly halfway between Beta and Alpha Pegasi.

The star's name of HR 8799 is its number in the Bright Star Catalogue. It also has the variable star designation V342 Pegasi.

== Stellar properties ==
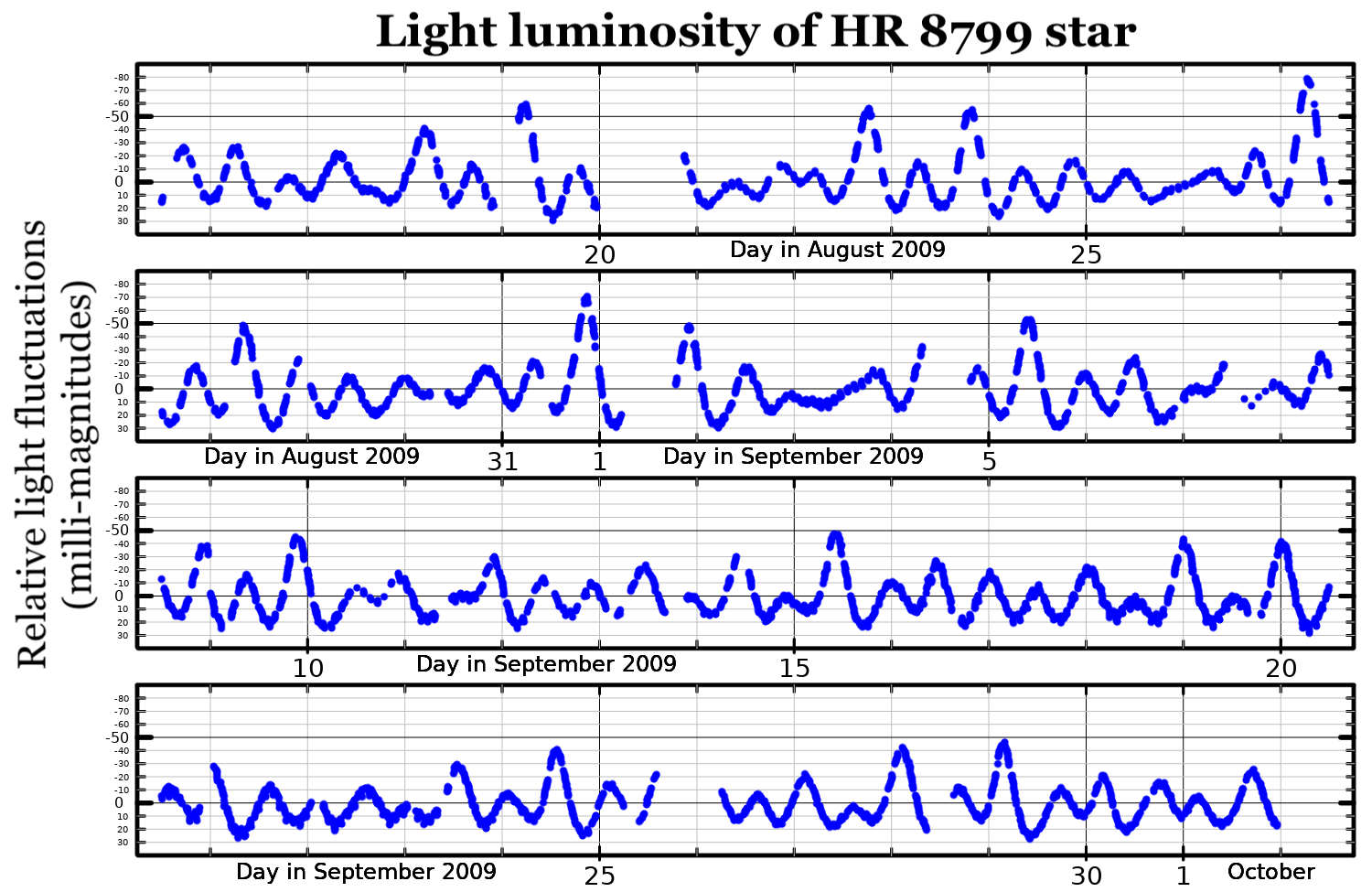
A broadband optical light curve for V342 Pegasi (HR 8799), adapted from Sódor et al. (2014)

The star HR 8799 is a member of the Lambda Boötis (λ Boo) class, a group of peculiar stars with an unusual lack of "metals" (elements heavier than hydrogen and helium) in their upper atmosphere. Because of this special status, stars like HR 8799 have a very complex spectral type. The luminosity profile of the Balmer lines in the star's spectrum, as well as the star's effective temperature, best match the typical properties of an F0 V star. However, the strength of the calcium II K absorption line and the other metallic lines are more like those of an A5 V star. The star's spectral type is therefore written as kA5 hF0 mA5 V; λ Boo, or more commonly with the hydrogen-based type first and usually omitting the 'h': F0VkA5mA5 λ Boo.

Age determination of this star shows significant variation depending on the method used. Statistically, for stars hosting a debris disk, the luminosity of this star suggests an age of about 20–150 million years. Comparison with stars having similar motion through space gives an age in the range 30–160 million years. Given the star's position on the Hertzsprung–Russell diagram of luminosity versus temperature, it has an estimated age in the range of 30–1,128 million years. λ Boötis stars like this are generally young, with a mean age of a billion years. More accurately, asteroseismology suggests an age of 1.1–1.4 billion years, although this is highly sensitive to the rotation angle of the star: a value of 36° instead of the assumed 50° would allow for lower ages between 26 and 430 million years. Older ages are disfavored because they would imply higher masses for the planets (which would be instead brown dwarfs) to fit into the cooling models, and the system would not have stable orbits due to the stronger gravitational perturbations. The best accepted value for an age of HR 8799 is 30 million years, consistent with being a member of the Columba association co-moving group of stars.

Earlier analysis of the star's spectrum reveals that it has a slight overabundance of carbon and oxygen compared to the Sun (by approximately 30% and 10% respectively). While some Lambda Boötis stars have sulfur abundances similar to that of the Sun, this is not the case for HR 8799; the sulfur abundance is only around 35% of the solar level. The star is also poor in elements heavier than sodium: for example, the iron abundance is only 28% of the solar iron abundance. Asteroseismic observations of other pulsating Lambda Boötis stars suggest that the peculiar abundance patterns of these stars are confined to the surface only: the bulk composition is likely more normal. This may indicate that the observed element abundances are the result of the accretion of metal-poor gas from the environment around the star.

In 2020, spectral analysis using multiple data sources have detected an inconsistency in prior data and concluded the star carbon and oxygen abundances are the same or slightly higher than solar. The iron abundance was updated to 30^{+6}_{−5}% of the solar value.

A 2011 asteroseismic analysis using spectroscopic data suggested that the rotational inclination of the star is greater than or approximately equal to 40°. However, such measurements are difficult due to the complex nature of the pulsations. If this value is accurate, it would contrast with the planets' orbital inclinations, which are in roughly the same plane with measured values between 22° and 28°. Hence, there may be an unexplained misalignment between the rotation of the star and the orbits of its planets. A more recent photometric analysis suggests a rotational inclination of 28+14
−3°, which is more consistent with that of the planets. Observation of this star with the Chandra X-ray Observatory indicates that it has a weak level of magnetic activity, but the X-ray activity is much higher than that of an A‑type star like Altair. This suggests that the internal structure of the star more closely resembles that of an F0 star. The temperature of the stellar corona is about 3.0 million K.

== Planetary system ==
The HR 8799 planetary system
Companion (in order from star)	Mass	Semimajor axis (AU)	Orbital period (years)	Eccentricity	Inclination (°)	Radius
f (unconfirmed)	1.65+1.27 −0.81 M_{J}	6.94+1.16 −0.95	—	0.11+0.18 −0.08	27.07+6.59 −6.52°	—
Dust disk	15±5 AU				—	—
e	11.7+1.9 −1.8 M_{J}	15.80+0.61 −0.50	52.37	0.13±0.02	22.4+3.2 −3.7	1.13±0.05 R_{J}
d	9.2±2.8 M_{J}	25.9+1.7 −1.6	104.7	0.10±0.07	28.2+4.6 −6.2	1.26±0.07 R_{J}
c	9.0±2.9 M_{J}	43.4+1.4 −1.3	209.5	0.02+0.02 −0.01	28.0+2.7 −3.2	1.10±0.01 R_{J}
b	4.7+2.8 −2.5 M_{J}	68.8+1.6 −3.6	419	0.04+0.05 −0.03	25.2+2.5 −4.4	1.19±0.03 R_{J}
Dust disk	135–360 AU				—	—

HR 8799 (center) with HR 8799 e (right), HR 8799 d (lower right), HR 8799 c (upper right), HR 8799 b (upper left) taken from W. M. Keck Observatory from 2009 – 2021

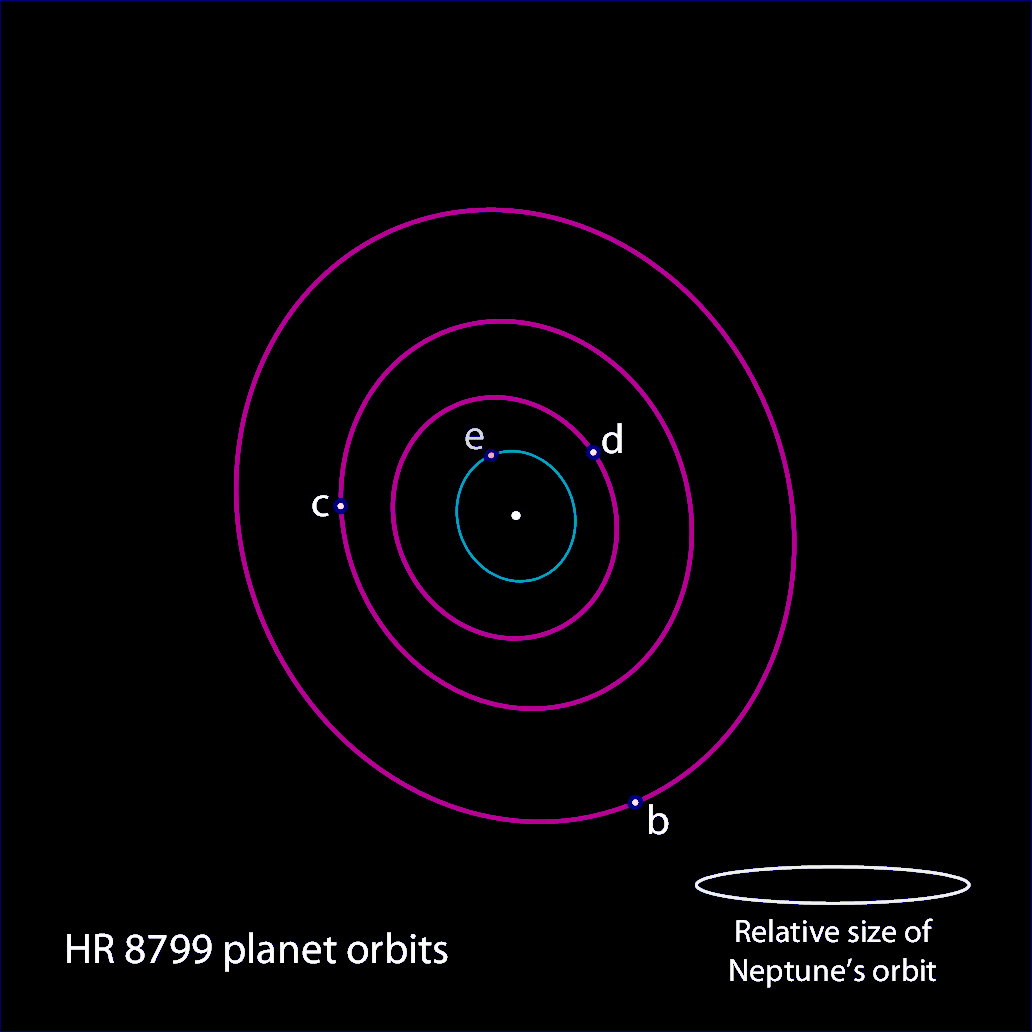
Orbit diagram of the HR 8799 planetary system

On 13 November 2008, Christian Marois of the National Research Council of Canada's Herzberg Institute of Astrophysics and his team announced they had directly observed three planets orbiting the star with the Keck and Gemini telescopes in Hawaii, in both cases employing adaptive optics to make observations in the infrared. (Note: The planets are young and therefore they are still hot and bright in the near-infrared part of the spectrum.) A precovery observation of the outer 3 planets was later found in infrared images obtained in 1998 by the Hubble Space Telescope's NICMOS instrument, after a newly developed image-processing technique was applied. Further observations in 2009–2010 revealed the fourth giant planet orbiting inside the first three planets at a projected separation just less than 15 AU, which has been confirmed by multiple studies.

HR 8799 b orbits inside a dusty disk like the Solar Kuiper belt. It is one of the most massive disks known around any star within 300 light years of Earth, and there is room in the inner system for terrestrial planets. There is an additional debris disk just inside the orbit of the innermost planet.

The orbital radii of planets e, d, c, and b are 2–3 times those of Jupiter, Saturn, Uranus, and Neptune's orbits, respectively. Because of the inverse square law relating radiation intensity to distance from the source, comparable radiation intensities are present at distances √4.9 ≈ 2.2 times farther from HR 8799 than from the Sun, it serendipitously turns out that corresponding planets in the solar and HR 8799 systems receive similar amounts of stellar radiation.

HR 8799 system is the first multiple-planet extrasolar system to be directly imaged. The orbital motion of the planets is in an anticlockwise direction and was confirmed via multiple observations dating back to 1998. The system is more likely to be stable if the planets e, d, and c are in a 4:2:1 resonance, which would imply that the orbit of the planet d has an eccentricity exceeding 0.04 in order to match the observational constraints. Planetary systems with the best-fit masses from evolutionary models would be stable if the outer three planets are in a 1:2:4 orbital resonance (similar to the Laplace resonance between Jupiter's inner three Galilean satellites: Io, Europa, and Ganymede as well as three of the planets in the Gliese 876 system). According to dynamical simulations, the HR 8799 planetary system may be in an 1:2:4:8 resonance.

The broadband photometry of planets b, c and d has shown that there may be significant clouds in their atmospheres, while the infrared spectroscopy of planets b and c points to non-equilibrium CO / CH_{4} chemistry. Near-infrared observations with the Project 1640 integral field spectrograph on the Palomar Observatory have shown that compositions between the four planets vary significantly. This is a surprise since the planets presumably formed in the same way from the same disk and have similar luminosities.

=== Additional planets ===
Since the discovery of planet e, many astronomers have speculated about the presence of a fifth planet in the system. A fifth inner planet could continue the chain of resonances if it were at a 3:1 or 2:1 resonance with HR 8799 e. Direct imaging has not yet been able to detect such an object due to low planet-to-star luminosity ratio and short angular separation, deriving upper limits for the presence of additional planets. The tightest limits as of 2021 rule out a planet with a mass over 3.6 M_{J} at 7.5 au, and over 2.8 M_{J} at 9.7 au.

Studies have reported tentative evidence for a fifth, innermost planet, named HR 8799 f, from imaging observations. One 2023 study using observations from the NIRC2 instrument aboard the Keck telescope found a tentative candidate at an orbital separation of 4–5 au and mass of 4–7 M_{J}. A stable orbit for the object is found at a semi-major axis of 4.325 au and an eccentricity of 0.0686 if it is coplanar with the other planets, or 4.51 au and 0.037 otherwise, with an inclination of 15°. Such a candidate would conflict with previous upper limits determined at shorter wavelengths unless if it had a redder color than the other planets.

Another paper with observations with the NIRISS Aperture Masking Interferometer (AMI) instrument aboard the James Webb Space Telescope detected a point source at a similar separation, but the source's position seems inconsistent with the predicted ephemeris of the orbital elements calculated for the 2023 detection, making it unlikely that both are the same object. Its position is however close to the predicted ephemeris by a model of five planets in orbital resonance, although this is not seen as substantial evidence for the existence of the putative planet.

An additional, outermost planet candidate was found in cycle 1 with the NIRCam instrument aboard the James Webb Space Telescope, five arcseconds south of HR 8799, and reported in a 2023 proposal.

A fifth planet, if confirmed, would make HR 8799 the first directly-imaged five-planet system.

=== Planet spectra ===
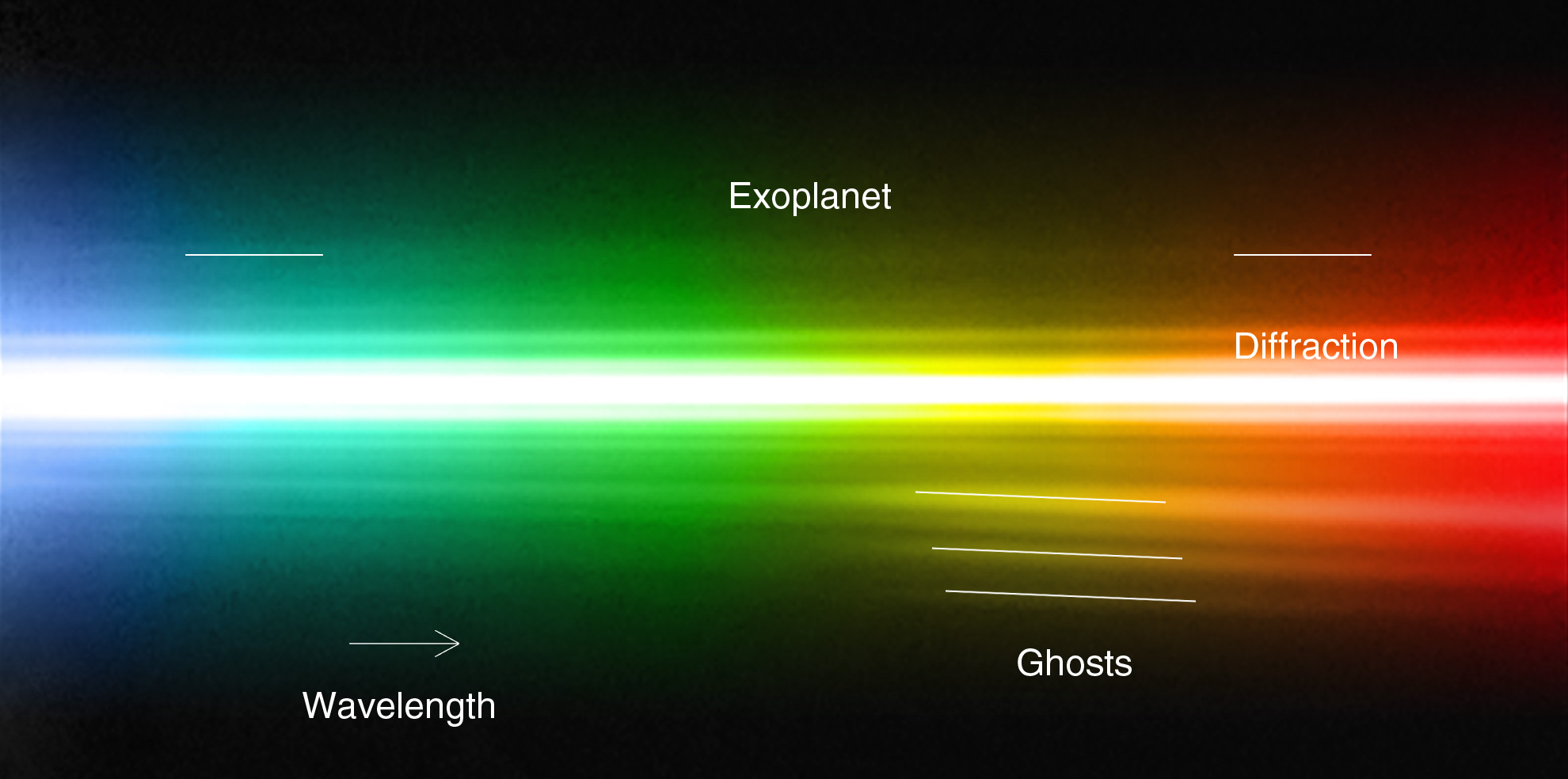
Spectrum of HR 8799 and planet c, obtained with the NACO adaptive optics instrument on ESO's Very Large Telescope. Credit: ESO/M. Janson.

A number of studies have used the spectra of HR 8799's planets to determine their chemical compositions and constrain their formation scenarios. The first spectroscopic study of planet b (performed at near-infrared wavelengths) detected strong water absorption and hints of methane absorption. Subsequently, weak methane and carbon monoxide absorption in this planet's atmosphere was also detected, indicating efficient vertical mixing of the atmosphere and a disequilibrium CO / CH_{4} ratio at the photosphere. Compared to models of planetary atmospheres, this first spectrum of planet b is best matched by a model of enhanced metallicity (about 10 times the metallicity of the Sun), which may support the notion that this planet formed through core-accretion.

The first simultaneous spectra of all four known planets in the HR 8799 system were obtained in 2012 using the Project 1640 instrument at Palomar Observatory. The near-infrared spectra from this instrument confirmed the red colors of all four planets and are best matched by models of planetary atmospheres that include clouds. Though these spectra do not directly correspond to any known astrophysical objects, some of the planet spectra demonstrate similarities with L- and T-type brown dwarfs and the night-side spectrum of Saturn. The implications of the simultaneous spectra of all four planets obtained with Project 1640 are summarized as follows: Planet b contains ammonia and/or acetylene as well as carbon dioxide, but has little methane; planet c contains ammonia, perhaps some acetylene but neither carbon dioxide nor substantial methane; planet d contains acetylene, methane, and carbon dioxide but ammonia is not definitively detected; planet e contains methane and acetylene but no ammonia or carbon dioxide. The spectrum of planet e is similar to a reddened spectrum of Saturn.

Moderate-resolution near-infrared spectroscopy, obtained with the Keck telescope, definitively detected carbon monoxide and water absorption lines in the atmosphere of planet c. The carbon-to-oxygen ratio, which is thought to be a good indicator of the formation history for giant planets, for planet c was measured to be slightly greater than that of the host star HR 8799. The enhanced carbon-to-oxygen ratio and depleted levels of carbon and oxygen in planet c favor a history in which the planet formed through core accretion. However, conclusions about the formation history of a planet based solely on its composition may be inaccurate if the planet has undergone significant migration, chemical evolution, or core dredging. Later, in November 2018, researchers confirmed the existence of water and the absence of methane in the atmosphere of HR 8799 c using high-resolution spectroscopy and near-infrared adaptive optics (NIRSPAO) at the Keck Observatory.

The red colors of the planets may be explained by the presence of iron and silicate atmospheric clouds, while their low surface gravities might explain the strong disequilibrium concentrations of carbon monoxide and the lack of strong methane absorption.

=== Debris disk ===
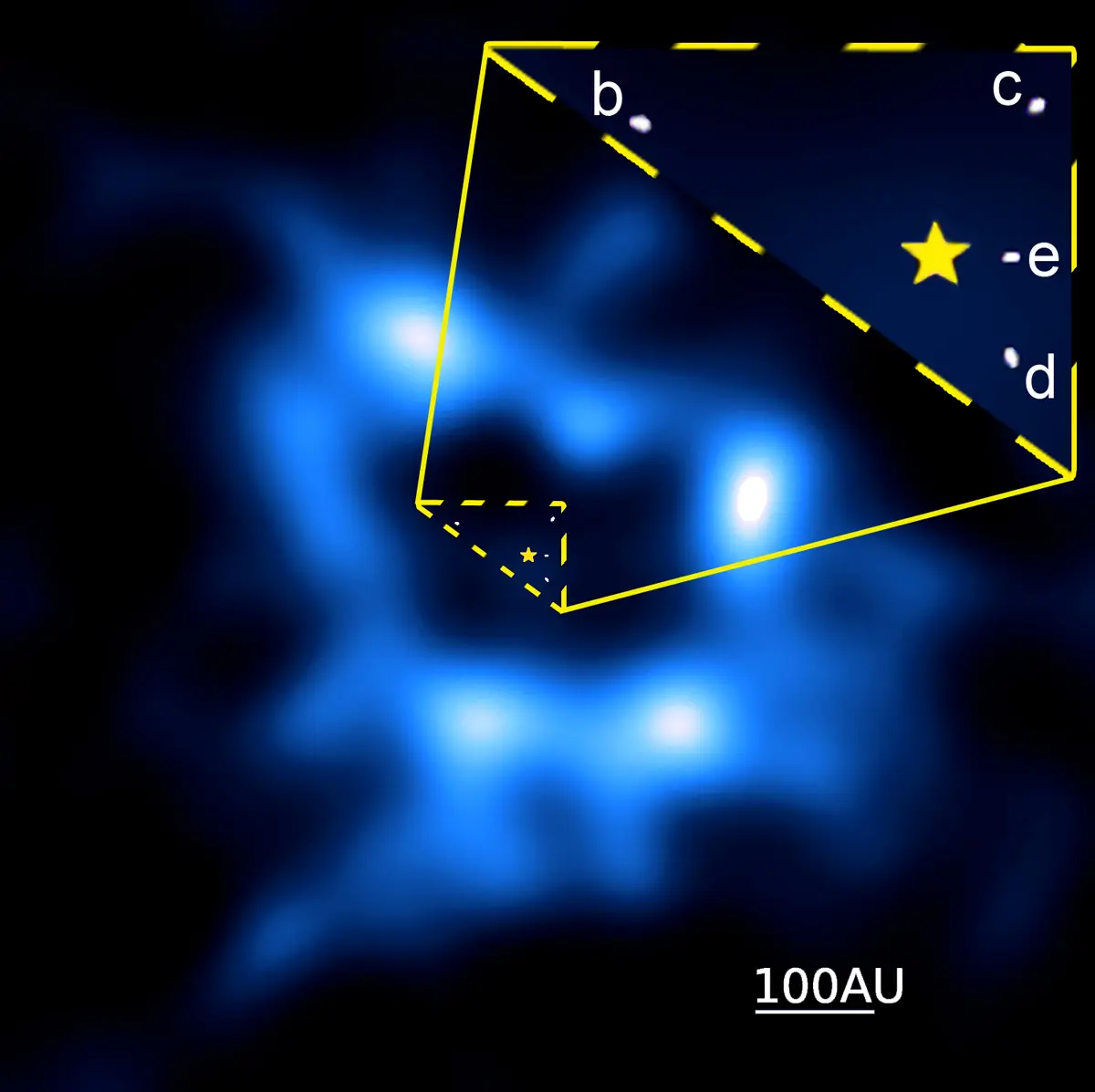
ALMA image of HR 8799's debris ring. The planets are shown in a zoom-in from images taken with the Very Large Telescope.

In January 2009 the Spitzer Space Telescope obtained images of the debris disk around HR 8799. Three components of the debris disk were distinguished:

1. Warm dust (T ≈ 150 K) orbiting within the innermost planet (e). The inner and outer edges of this belt are close to 4:1 and 2:1 resonances with the planet.
2. A broad zone of cold dust (T ≈ 45 K) with a sharp inner edge orbiting just outside the outermost planet (b). The inner edge of this belt is approximately in 3:2 resonance with said planet, similar to Neptune and the Kuiper belt.
3. A dramatic halo of small grains originating in the cold dust component.

The halo is unusual and implies a high level of dynamic activity which is likely due to gravitational stirring by the massive planets. The Spitzer team says that collisions are likely occurring among bodies similar to those in the Kuiper Belt and that the three large planets may not yet have settled into their final, stable orbits.

In the photo, the bright, yellow-white portions of the dust cloud come from the outer cold disk. The huge extended dust halo, seen in orange-red, has a diameter of ≈2,000 AU. The diameter of Pluto's orbit (≈80AU) is shown for reference as a dot in the centre.

This disk is so thick that it threatens the young system's stability.

The disk was first resolved with ALMA in 2016 and was later imaged again in 2018. These later observations were more detailed and were studied by a team of astronomers. The disk has according to this team a smooth inner edge and a smooth outer edge. These also observed a possible inner dust belt. This inner belt was confirmed with MIRI observations, which measured a radius of 15 au of the inner disk.

=== Vortex Coronagraph: Testbed for high-contrast imaging technology ===
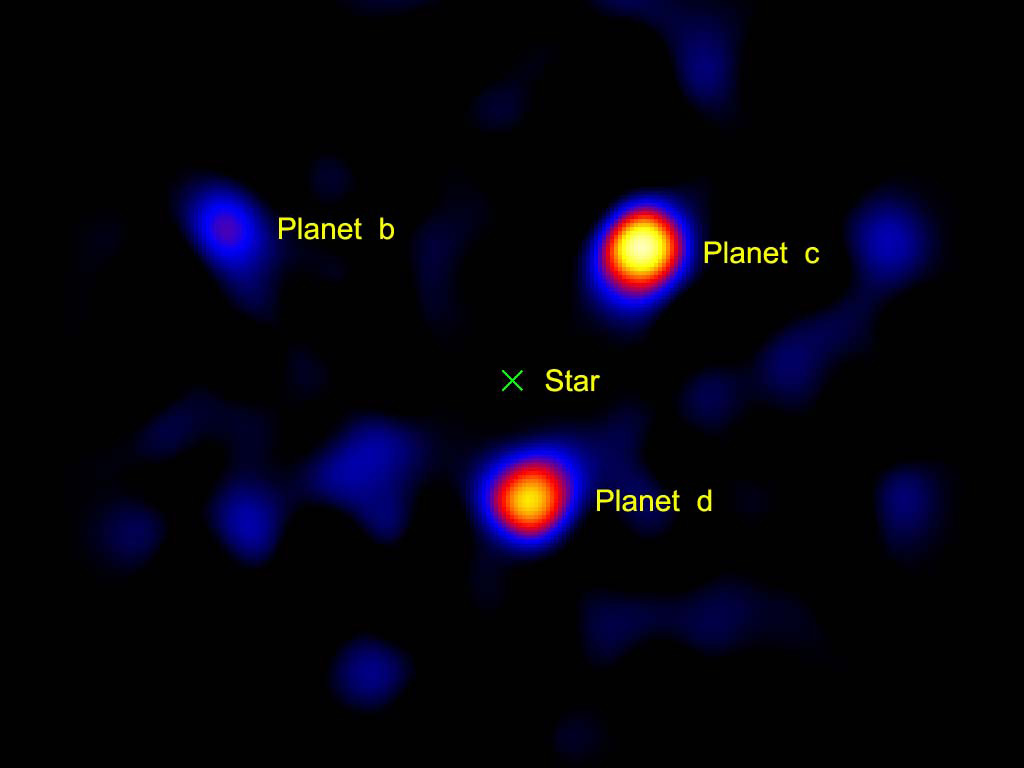
Direct image of exoplanets around the star HR 8799 using a vortex coronagraph on a 1.5 m portion of the Hale Telescope

Up until the year 2010, telescopes could only directly image exoplanets under exceptional circumstances. Specifically, it is easier to obtain images when the planet is especially large (considerably larger than Jupiter), widely separated from its parent star, and hot so that it emits intense infrared radiation. However, in 2010 a team from NASAs Jet Propulsion Laboratory demonstrated that a vortex coronagraph could enable small telescopes to directly image planets. They did this by imaging the previously imaged HR 8799 planets using just a 1.5 m portion of the Hale Telescope.

=== NICMOS images ===
In 2009, an old NICMOS image was processed to show a predicted exoplanet around HR 8799. In 2011, three further exoplanets were rendered viewable in a NICMOS image taken in 1998, using advanced data processing. The image allows the planets' orbits to be better characterised, since they take many decades to orbit their host star.

=== Search for radio emissions ===
Starting in 2010, astronomers searched for radio emissions from the exoplanets orbiting HR 8799 using the radio telescope at Arecibo Observatory. Despite the large masses, warm temperatures, and brown dwarf-like luminosities, they failed to detect any emissions at 5 GHz down to a flux density detection threshold of 1.0 mJy.

== See also ==
- List of exoplanets
- Circumplanetary disc
- HD 163296
- HD 100546
