= HIP 99770 b =

Substellar object orbiting HIP 99770

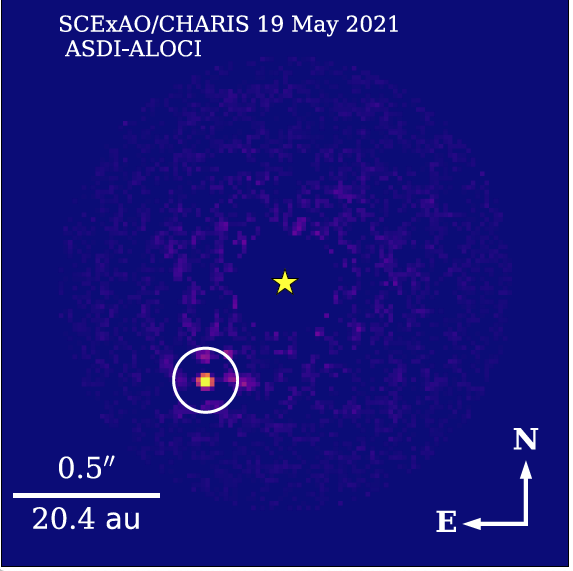
- Subaru Telescope detection of HIP 99770 b

Discovery
- Discovered by: Currie et al.
- Discovery site: Subaru Telescope
- Discovery date: November 30, 2022
- Detection method: Direct imaging

Orbital characteristics
- Semi-major axis: 15.7+3.5 −1.0 AU
- Eccentricity: 0.31+0.06 −0.12
- Orbital period (sidereal): 47+14 −4 years
- Inclination: 151.3+8.4 −12.0 °
- Longitude of ascending node: 279°+72° −269°
- Time of periastron: 2,465,218+3,763 −771 JD
- Argument of periastron: 250°+68° −218°
- Star: 29 Cygni

Physical characteristics
- Mean radius: 1.056 R_{J}
- Mass: 13.6+4.8 −5.1 or 15.2+4.6 −4.4 M_{J}
- Temperature: 1,300 K
- Spectral type: L8

HIP 99770 b (also known as 29 Cygni b) is a directly imaged super-Jupiter and gas giant exoplanet orbiting the A-type star HIP 99770 (29 Cygni) and detected with Gaia/Hipparcos precision astrometry and high-contrast imaging. HIP 99770 b could be considered the first joint direct imaging plus astrometric discovery of an extrasolar planet and the first planet discovered using precision astrometry from the Gaia mission.

== Discovery ==
HIP 99770 b was discovered by a team led by Thayne Currie, Mirek Brandt, and Tim Brandt using the Subaru Telescope on Mauna Kea. The Subaru data utilized the observatory's extreme adaptive optics system, SCExAO, to correct for atmospheric turbulence and the CHARIS integral field spectrograph to detect HIP 99770 b at 22 different near-infrared wavelength passbands from 1.1 microns to 2.4 microns. It was also detected at longer wavelengths using the NIRC2 camera on the Keck Observatory.

== Characteristics ==
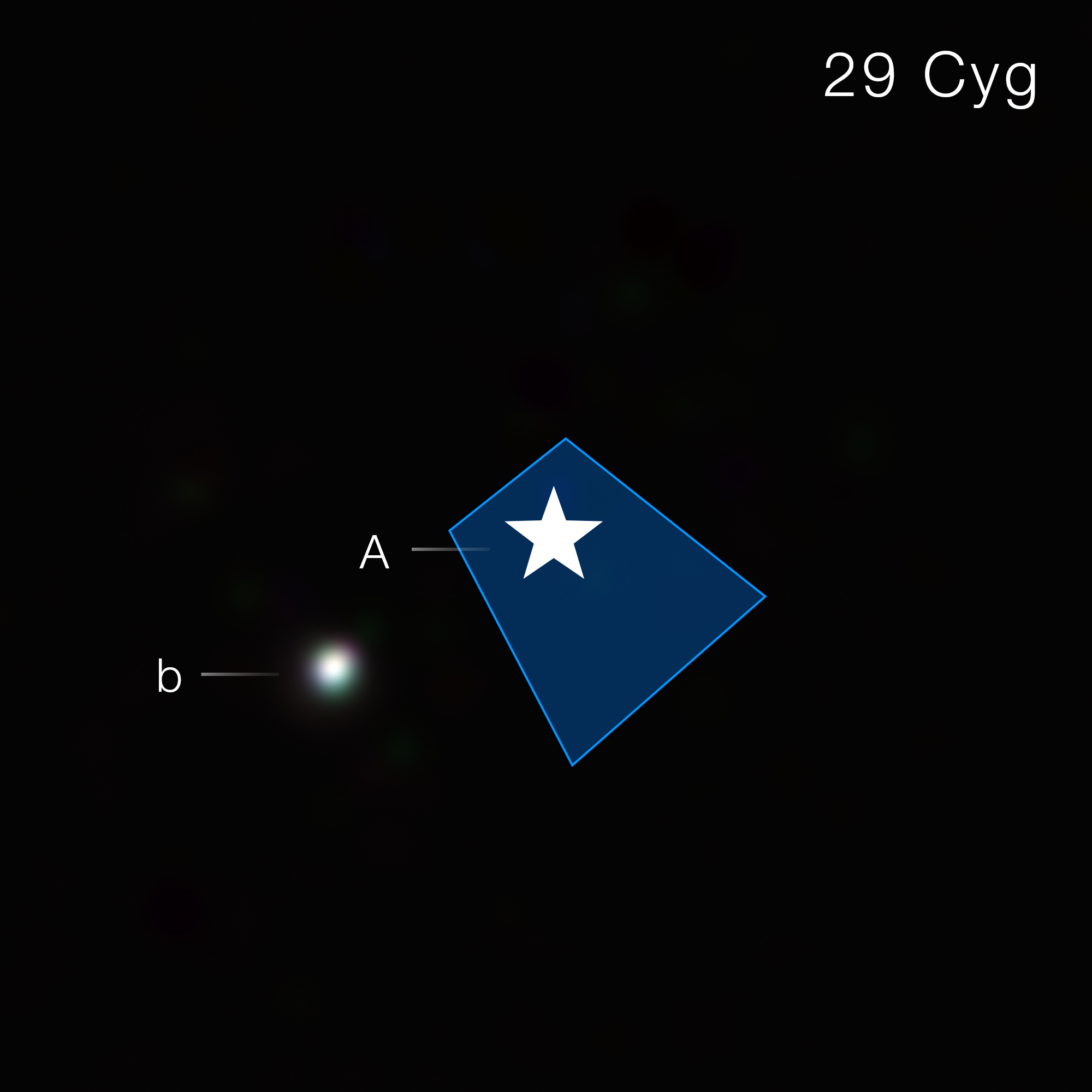
HIP 99770 b imaged by the James Webb Space Telescope

The orbit of HIP 99770 b has been measured using both absolute astrometry of HIP 99770 as measured by Gaia and Hipparcos, and its relative astrometry (location with respect to the host star) from SCExAO/CHARIS, VLTI/GRAVITY, and JWST/NIRCam. As of 2025, the most recent orbital solution gives an orbital period of 47 years, a semi-major axis of 15.8 astronomical units, an orbital eccentricity of 0.29, and an inclination of 151°. As the host star is significantly more luminous than the Sun, HIP 99770 b receives roughly as much light as Jupiter receives from the Sun.

Atmospheric modelling gives a temperature of about 1,300 K and a radius of 1.056 R_{J}. With a spectral type of L8, HIP 99770 b lies at the L/T transition for substellar objects, from cloudy atmospheres without methane absorption to clear atmospheres with methane absorption. The companion is likely intermediate in cloudiness and gravity between older, more massive field brown dwarfs and young L/T transition exoplanets like HR 8799 d. Ground-based high-resolution spectroscopy reveals evidence for water and carbon monoxide in the companion’s atmosphere.

The mass of HIP 99770 b is directly measured from joint dynamical modeling of the planet's relative astrometry from direct imaging data and absolute astrometry of the host star. As of 2025, mass estimates range between 13.1 M_{J} and 15.0 M_{J}. Thus HIP 99770 b likely straddles the deuterium burning limit, and as such, it has been considered a super-Jupiter. While the deuterium burning limit has often been used as a mass criterion to distinguish between planets and brown dwarfs, the discovery paper showed that HIP 99770 b's mass and mass ratio (mass divided by the mass of the host star) were instead more consistent with values for planets than brown dwarfs.

With a mass of 13-15 Jupiter masses, HIP 99770 b probes the extremes of multiple potential formation mechanisms. However, formation within a protoplanetary disk may encode varying abundances of heavy elements in the planet’s atmosphere, which are different from the host star’s composition. Analysis of JWST/NIRCam data finds evidence for significant metal enrichment in HIP 99770 b’s atmosphere from empirical comparisons and atmospheric modeling. HIP 99770 b’s orbit is also consistent with the spin-axis of the host star at the 2-sigma level, like other planets such as HR 8799 bcde, 51 Eri b, and the solar system planets. Combined together, "this evidence strongly suggests that 29 Cygni b formed within a protoplanetary disk through rapid accretion of metal-rich material, rather than through gas fragmentation … form[ing] like a planet and not like a star." Its relatively small orbital separation and location near the system's ice line also suggests it may have formed in a protoplanetary disk.

== See also ==
- List of exoplanets discovered in 2023
