= Star count =

Bookkeeping survey of stars

Star counts are census counts of stars and the statistical and geometrical methods used to correct the corresponding data for bias. The surveys are most often made of nearby stars in the Milky Way galaxy.

The total number of stars counted in a particular direction depends on the location and density of stars, the luminosity function, and the absorption. Star count programs can therefore collect data that bounds or determines these values.

One of the interests of astronomy is to determine how many stars there are of each of several types that stars can be categorized into, and how these stars are distributed in space.

== Reasons for star counts ==
When performing star counts, astronomers consider many different categories that have been created to classify a few stars that have been well studied. One of the hopes of studying the results of star counts is to discover new categories. Different counts typically seek to categorize stars for only a few of the qualities listed below, and determine how common each considered quality is and how stars of that kind are distributed.

- Temperature: In astronomy, temperature is usually shown using the letter codes O B A F G K M running from 'blue' (type O, actually bluish white) through white (type F) to 'red' (type M, actually ruddy orange). Types L and T are used for brown dwarfs, whose 'colors' are in the infrared.
- Size: Size is usually designated by Roman numerals I (supergiants) through V (dwarfs).
- Age: Stars are usually grouped into Population I (young) and Population II (old).
- Location: In the Milky Way galaxy the groups are described as thin disk, thick disk, central bulge, and halo.
- Multiplicity: Most stars are members of double star, or triple star, or even double-double star systems. Our own sun appears to be unusual for not having a companion star.

There are many finer subdivisions in all of the above categories.

== Bias ==
There are many unavoidable problems in counting stars for the purpose of getting an accurate picture of the distribution of stars in space. The effects of our point of view in the galaxy, the obscuring clouds of gas and dust in the galaxy, and especially the extreme range of inherent brightness, create a biased view of stars.

- Stars vary far more in intrinsic brightness than they do in distance.
- Our line of sight through the Milky Way is interrupted by great clouds of gas and dust, which block our view of stars more than a few thousand light-years away.
- The Sun is located in the disk of the Milky Way, in the northern edge of the thin disk and on the inner edge of a spiral arm called the Orion–Cygnus Arm. There is good reason to believe that stars in the galaxy's thin disk are different from thicker part of the disk, and from the bulge and the halo. Some stars are obviously more common in spiral arms than in the disk in between the arms.

Knowing that these effects create bias, astronomers analyzing star counts attempt to find how much bias each effect has caused and then compensate for it as well as they can.

== Inherent luminosity complications ==
The greatest problem biasing star counts is the extreme differences in inherent brightness of different sizes.

Heavy, bright stars (both giants and blue dwarfs) are the most common stars listed in general star catalogs, even though on average they are rare in space. Small dim stars (red dwarfs) seem to be the most common stars in space, at least locally, but can only be seen with large telescopes, and then only when they are within a few tens of light-years from Earth.

For example, the blue supergiant ζ Puppis is 400 million times more luminous than the nearest star, a red dwarf named Proxima, or α Centauri C. Even though Proxima is only 4.2 light-years away from us, it is so dim that it cannot be seen with the naked eye (one of its companions, α Centauri A, is visible). ζ Puppis is one of the brightest of the visible blue supergiants. It is so bright that it appears to be a second magnitude star, even though ζ Puppis is 1,399 light-years away.
