= 28 Cygni =

Star in the constellation Cygnus

- Location of 28 Cygni (circled in red)

Observation data Epoch J2000 Equinox J2000
- Constellation: Cygnus
- Right ascension: 20^{h} 09^{m} 25.61906^{s}
- Declination: +36° 50′ 22.6340″
- Apparent magnitude (V): 4.93

Characteristics
- Spectral type: B2.5 V or B2 IV(e) + sdO
- B−V color index: −0.139±0.004
- Variable type: SX Ari

Astrometry
Radial velocity (R_{v})	−0.36±2.59 km/s
Proper motion (μ)	RA: +2.739 mas/yr Dec.: +13.168 mas/yr
Parallax (π)	3.8921±0.1129 mas
Distance	840 ± 20 ly (257 ± 7 pc)
Absolute magnitude (M_{V})	−2.56

Details

A
Mass	6.26±0.28 M_{☉}
Radius	6.5 (equator); 5.7 (polar) R_{☉}
Luminosity	1,353.22 L_{☉}
Surface gravity (log g)	3.983 cgs
Temperature	20,470 K
Rotational velocity (v sin i)	320 km/s
Age	22.1±2.8 Myr

B
Mass	0.76±0.28 M_{☉}

Orbit
Primary	A
Name	B
Period (P)	359.260±0.041 days
Semi-major axis (a)	1.89±0.06 AU
Eccentricity (e)	0
Inclination (i)	118.7±0.2°
Longitude of the node (Ω)	146.0±0.3°
Argument of periastron (ω) (secondary)	90°
Semi-amplitude (K_{1}) (primary)	5.4±1.7 km/s
Semi-amplitude (K_{2}) (secondary)	44.9±1.0 km/s

Other designations
- b^{2} Cygni, 28 Cygni, V1624 Cygni, BD+36°3907, HD 191610, HIP 99303, HR 7708, SAO 69518

Database references
SIMBAD	data

28 Cygni is a binary star in the northern constellation of Cygnus. It is a faint blue-white hued star but visible to the naked eye with an apparent visual magnitude of 4.93. The distance to 28 Cyg, as estimated from its annual parallax shift of 3.9 mas, is around 840 light years. It has an absolute magnitude of −2.56, which means that if the star were just 10 parsecs (33 light-years) away it would be brighter than Sirius, the brightest star in the night sky.

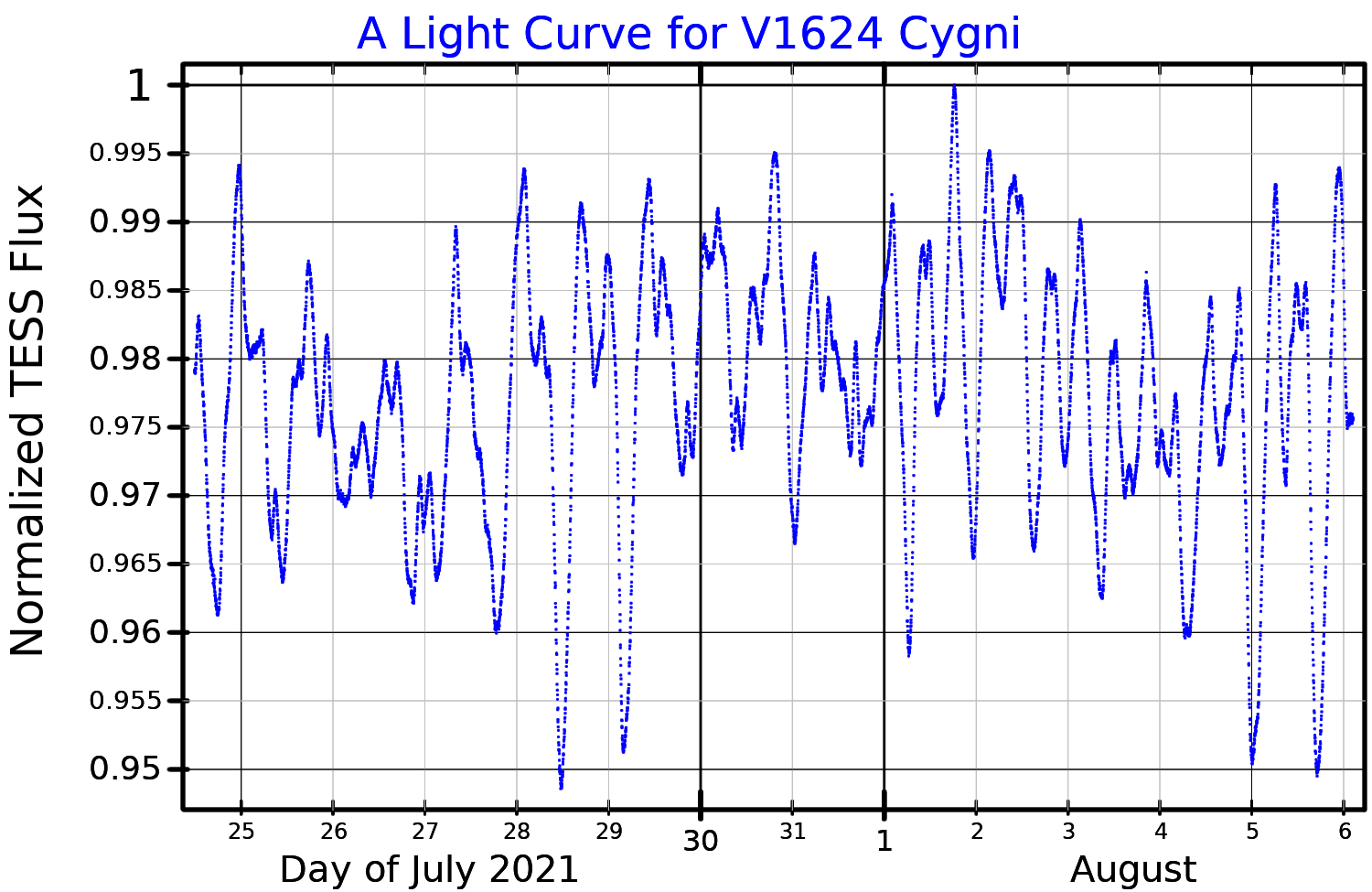
A light curve for V1624 Cygni, plotted from TESS data

This primary object is a B-type main-sequence star with a stellar classification of B2.5 V, per Lesh (1968). Slettebak (1982) found a class of B2 IV(e), which would suggest this is a more evolved subgiant star. It is a Be star, which means the spectrum displays emission lines due a disk of ejected gas in a Keplerian orbit around the star. The star displays short-term variability with two or more periods, and is classified as an SX Arietis variable by Samus et al. (2017). It is spinning rapidly with a projected rotational velocity of 320 km/s; estimated at round 80% of the critical rotation rate. This is giving the star an oblate shape with an equatorial bulge out to 6.5 times the Sun's radius, compared to 5.7 at the poles.

The companion is a subdwarf O star. After previous failed attempts to find the star, the companion was detected using interferometry. It has an orbital period of nearly a year and is separated by 1.9 astronomical units from its host.
