= 27 Cygni =

Star in the constellation Cygnus

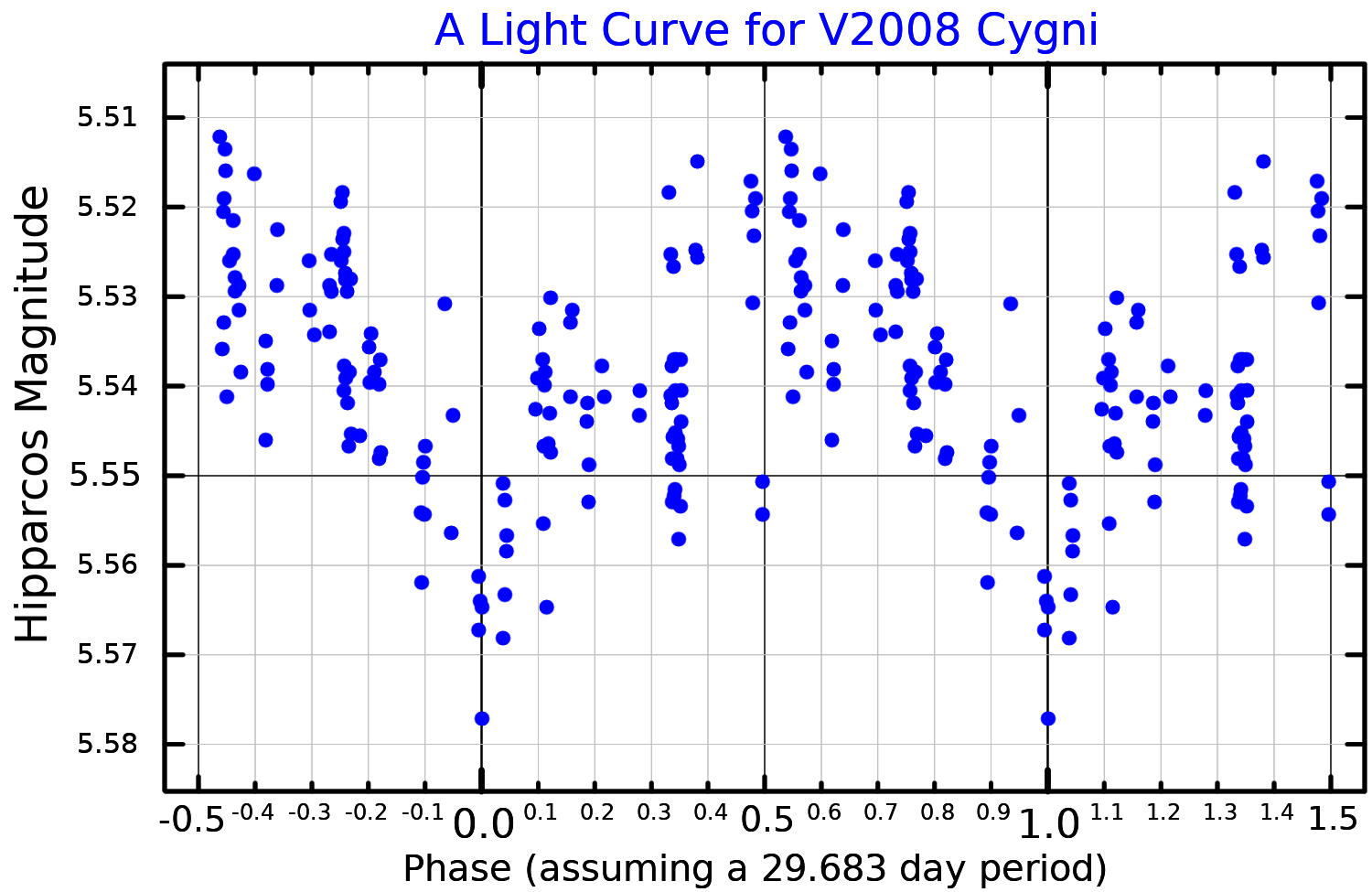
- A light curve for V2008 Cygni, plotted from Hipparcos data

Observation data Epoch J2000 Equinox J2000
- Constellation: Cygnus
- Right ascension: 20^{h} 06^{m} 21.76743^{s}
- Declination: +35° 58′ 20.8875″
- Apparent magnitude (V): 5.38

Characteristics
- Evolutionary stage: subgiant
- Spectral type: G8.5 IVa
- B−V color index: +0.85
- Variable type: RS CVn

Astrometry
| Radial velocity (R_{v}) | −32.98±0.09 km/s |
| Proper motion (μ) | RA: −225.032 mas/yr Dec.: −440.042 mas/yr |
| Parallax (π) | 41.7718±0.0845 mas |
| Distance | 78.1 ± 0.2 ly (23.94 ± 0.05 pc) |
| Absolute magnitude (M_{V}) | 3.48 |

Details
| Mass | 1.26±0.03 M_{☉} |
| Radius | 2.51±0.05 R_{☉} |
| Luminosity | 4.07+0.50 −0.44 L_{☉} |
| Surface gravity (log g) | 3.74±0.07 cgs |
| Temperature | 5,108±26 K |
| Metallicity [Fe/H] | −0.02±0.05 dex |
| Rotational velocity (v sin i) | 1.78±0.23 km/s |
| Age | 4.34±0.40 Gyr |

Other designations
- b^{1} Cygni, 27 Cygni, V2008 Cygni, BD+35°3959, HD 191026, HIP 99031, HR 7689, SAO 69413, WDS J20064+3558A

Database references
| SIMBAD | data |

27 Cygni is a subgiant star in the northern constellation of Cygnus. It is faintly visible to the naked eye with an apparent visual magnitude of 5.38. The distance to this system, as estimated from its annual parallax shift of 41.77 mas, is 78.1 light-years. At that distance, the visual magnitude is diminished by an extinction of 0.05 due to interstellar dust. It is moving closer to the Earth with a heliocentric radial velocity of −33 km/s, and has a relatively high proper motion, traversing the celestial sphere at the rate of 0.495″ per year.

27 Cygni is a G-type subgiant with a stellar classification of G8.5 IVa, a star that has used up its core hydrogen and is starting to expand. It was found to be slightly variable by Percy et al. (1986), changing by up to 0.05 in visual magnitude with a characteristic time scale of 50–60 days. Further observations suggested a possible rotation period of around 42 days. Samus et al. (2017) classify it as a suspected RS Canum Venaticorum variable, meaning that it is a close binary star whose components have star-spots that cause rotationally-modulated variations in brightness. It has been given the variable star designation V2008 Cygni.

27 Cygni is listed in multiple star catalogues with three faint companions within one arc-minute. The two closer ones are unrelated background objects, while the third has a similar distance and space motion and is described as a common proper motion companion.
