= HR 8799 e =

Jovian planet orbiting HR 8799

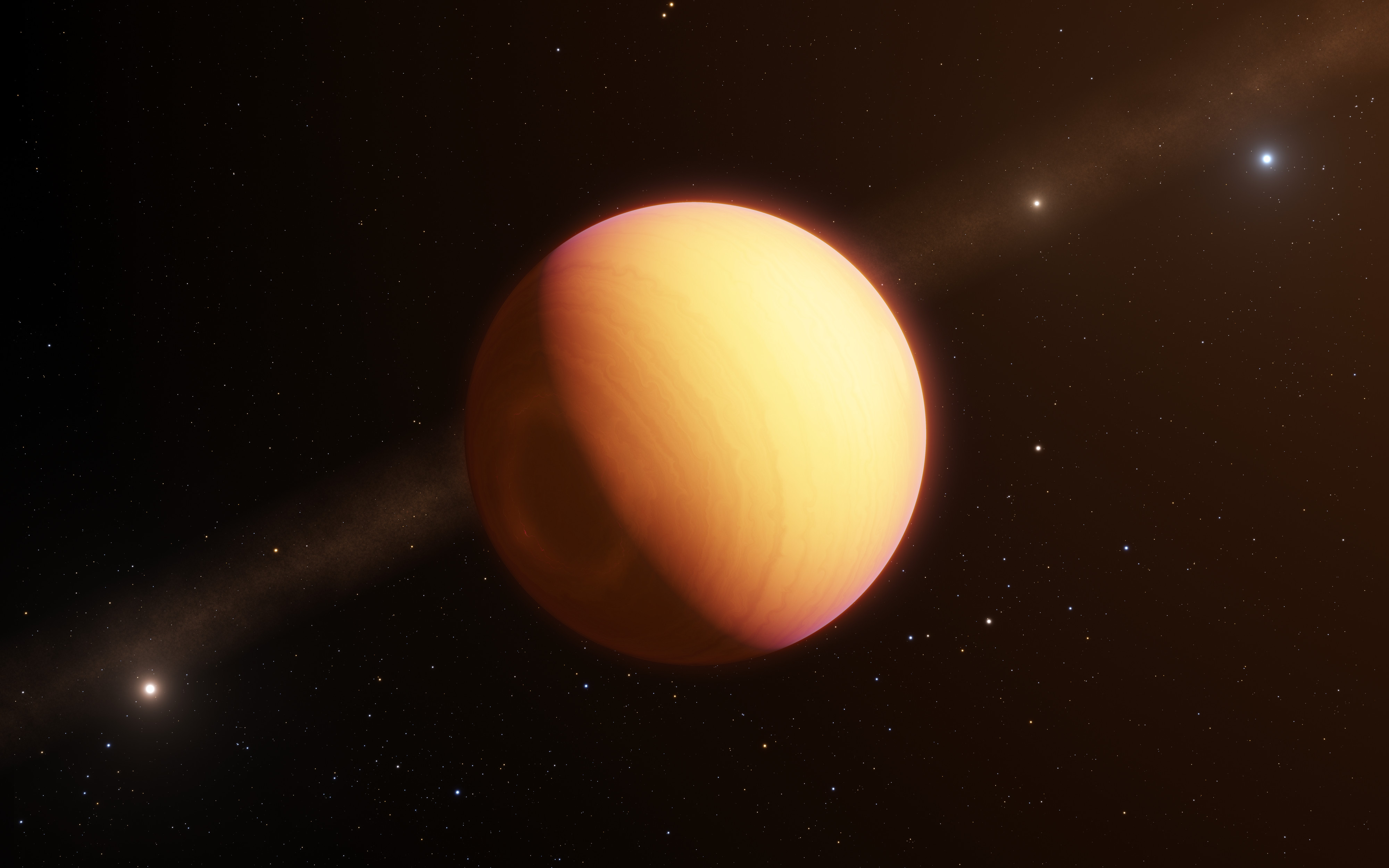
- Artistic rendering of HR 8799 e as a hot gas giant

Discovery
- Discovered by: Marois et al.
- Discovery site: Keck and Gemini observatories in Hawaii
- Discovery date: November 1, 2010 (announced); November 22, 2010 (published)
- Detection method: Direct imaging

Orbital characteristics
- Semi-major axis: 15.80+0.61 −0.50 AU
- Eccentricity: 0.13±0.02
- Orbital period (sidereal): 52.37 years
- Inclination: 22.38+3.17 −3.66 °
- Longitude of ascending node: 58.43+8.18 −9.77 °
- Argument of periastron: 104.81+12.58 −9.88 °
- Star: HR 8799

Physical characteristics
- Mean radius: 1.13±0.05 R_{J}
- Mass: 11.67+1.87 −1.78 M_{J}
- Surface gravity: 10^{4.18+0.06 −0.05} cgs
- Temperature: 1,138+30 −22 K
- Spectral type: ~L7

HR 8799 e is a large exoplanet, orbiting the star HR 8799, which lies 129 light-years from Earth. This gas giant has 7.5 times the mass of Jupiter and 1.13 times its radius. Due to their young age, all four discovered planets in the HR 8799 system are large, compared to all gas giants in the Solar System.

== Description ==
HR 8799 e is the fourth planet orbiting HR 8799 in order of discovery. It is a young, hot and massive gas giant, lying just between the orbits of Saturn and Uranus in the Solar System. The planet is still glowing red-hot.

HR 8799 e is the innermost known planet as it orbits closer to its star than the other three known planets in this planetary system. This planet orbits at semi-major axis of 16 AU and has an orbital period of 52.37 years.

== Discovery ==
A team of researchers led by Christian Marois at the National Research Council's Herzberg Institute of Astrophysics identified the planet from data taken in 2009 and 2010 using the W.M. Keck Observatory in the K and L spectral bands. They announced their findings on 22 November 2010. A separate work reporting the detection of HR 8799 e, led by Thayne Currie and using the Very Large Telescope, was made public six weeks later. Observations obtained since then with the Large Binocular Telescope show that HR 8799 e has a spectrum and temperature similar to HR 8799 c and d.

== Observations ==
In 2013, near infrared spectroscopy from 995 to 1769 nanometers made with the Palomar Observatory showed evidence of methane and acetylene but no signs of ammonia or carbon dioxide gas. There is no explanation as to why the planet shows strong methane absorption, but the other 3 planets in this system do not, despite all 4 planets having similar atmospheric temperatures.

On 27 March 2019, the European Southern Observatory announced the result of their Very Large Telescope astronomical interferometer (VLTI) imaging of HR 8799 e employing the GRAVITY instrument. This was the first direct observation of any exoplanet using optical interferometry. A spectrum ten times more detailed than earlier observations revealed a complex exoplanetary atmosphere with clouds of iron and silicates swirling in a planet-wide storm. Team leader Sylvestre Lacour said:

"Our analysis showed that HR 8799 e has an atmosphere containing far more carbon monoxide than methane — something not expected from equilibrium chemistry. We can best explain this surprising result with high vertical winds within the atmosphere preventing the carbon monoxide from reacting with hydrogen to form methane."

The observations with GRAVITY confirmed the spectral type of ~L7 for the planet HR 8799 e. Previously the spectral type suggested a higher temperature than the measured effective temperature. The GRAVITY observations showed that the planet has a low surface gravity, which solved the discrepancy. A low surface gravity is also observed for many young brown dwarfs and is seen as an indicator of youth.

The detection of water and carbon monoxide in the planetary atmosphere was announced in 2021, as was an astrometric measurement of the planet's mass.

The detection of water and carbon dioxide in the planetary atmosphere was announced in 2025. It was the first time CO_{2} was directly (as opposed to by transit spectra) detected in an exoplanet.
