= AF Leporis =

Variable star in the constellation Lepus

- Location of AF Leporis (circled)

Observation data Epoch J2000 Equinox ICRS
- Constellation: Lepus
- Right ascension: 05^{h} 27^{m} 04.76333^{s}
- Declination: −11° 54′ 03.4660″
- Apparent magnitude (V): 6.26 - 6.35

Characteristics
- Evolutionary stage: Main sequence
- Spectral type: F8V(n)k:
- Apparent magnitude (B): 6.832±0.015
- Apparent magnitude (V): 6.295±0.010
- Apparent magnitude (G): 6.209±0.003
- Apparent magnitude (J): 5.268±0.027
- Apparent magnitude (H): 5.087±0.026
- Apparent magnitude (K): 4.926±0.021
- Variable type: RS CVn

Astrometry
Radial velocity (R_{v})	21.10±0.37 km/s
Proper motion (μ)	RA: 16.915 mas/yr Dec.: −49.318 mas/yr
Parallax (π)	37.2539±0.0195 mas
Distance	87.55 ± 0.05 ly (26.84 ± 0.01 pc)
Absolute magnitude (M_{V})	4.14

Details
Mass	1.218+0.029 −0.039 M_{☉}
Radius	1.25±0.06 R_{☉}
Luminosity (bolometric)	1.84±0.01 L_{☉}
Surface gravity (log g)	4.30±0.05 cgs
Temperature	6130±60 K
Metallicity [Fe/H]	+0.19±0.02 dex
Rotation	0.9660±0.0023 d
Rotational velocity (v sin i)	50±5 km/s
Age	24±3 Myr

Other designations
- AF Lep, NSV 16310, BD−12 1169, FK5 2409, HD 35850, HIP 25486, HR 1817, SAO 150461, PPM 215789, TIC 94945758, TYC 5340-1141-1, GCRV 3284, GSC 05340-01141, IRAS 05247-1156

Database references
SIMBAD	data
Exoplanet Archive	data
ARICNS	data

AF Leporis, also known as HD 35850, is a young variable star located 87.5 light-years (26.8 parsecs) away from the Solar System in the constellation of Lepus. With an apparent magnitude of 6.3, it is near the limit of naked eye visibility under ideal conditions. AF Leporis is a member of the Beta Pictoris moving group, with an astronomically young age of about 24 million years. It hosts a circumstellar disk and one known exoplanet.

== Characteristics ==
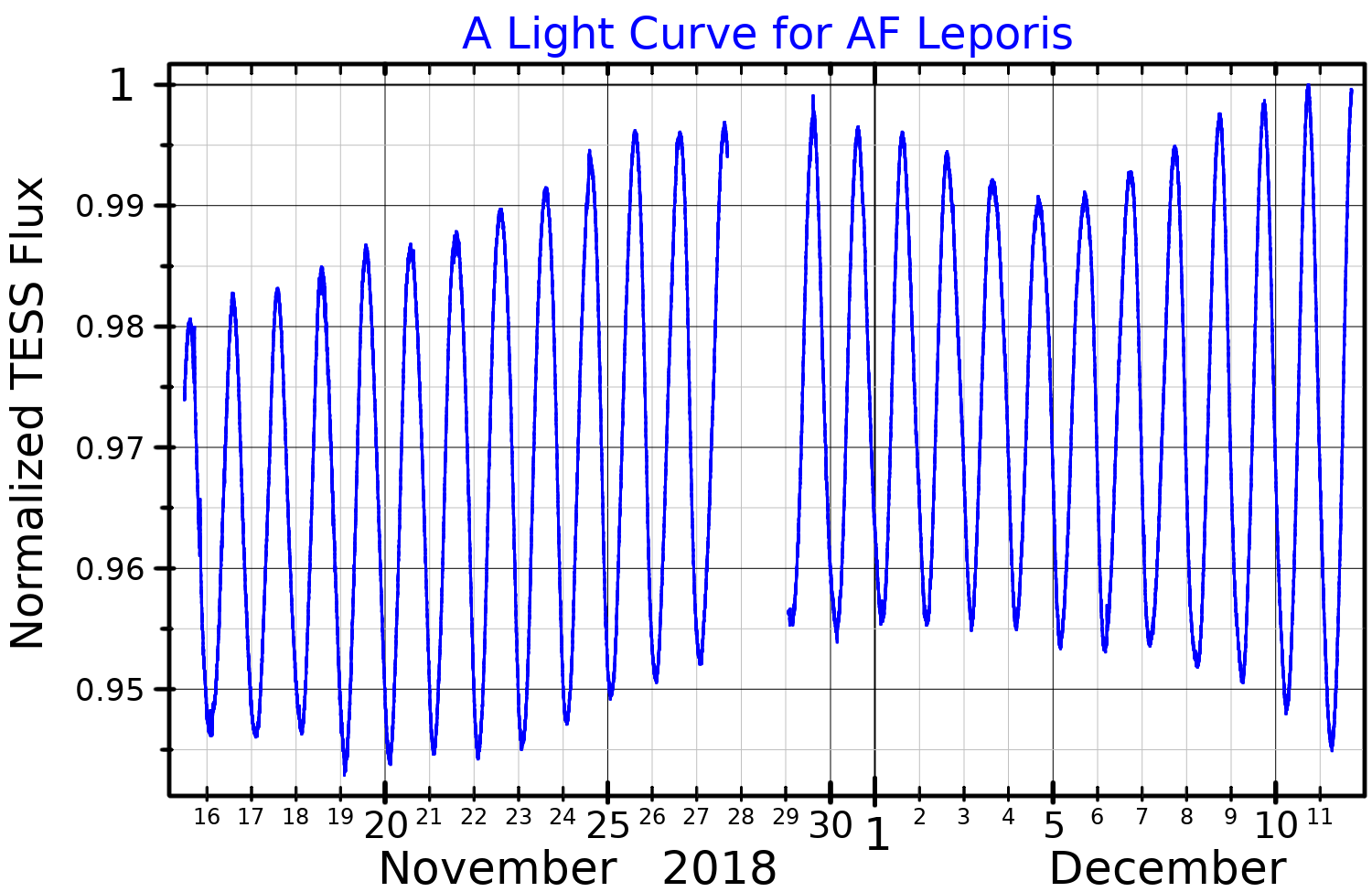
A light curve for AF Leporis, plotted from TESS data

The stellar classification of AF Leporis is F8V(n)k:, matching an F-type main-sequence star that is generating energy through hydrogen fusion at its core. (The 'n' indicates "nebulous" lines due to spin, while the 'k' means it displays interstellar absorption lines. The ':' suffix is used to note some uncertainty in the classification.) AF Leporis is classified as a RS Canum Venaticorum variable star, which means it has an active surface with large star spots that cause the net luminosity to vary as it rotates.

While some studies consider AF Leporis to be a close spectroscopic binary with a separation of 0.021 AU, other studies show no evidence of binarity, and it is likely that the supposed binarity is an artifact resulting from the presence of starspots.

It is about 24 million years old and is spinning rapidly with a projected rotational velocity of around 50 km/s, giving it a rotation period of less than a day. The star has 9% more mass than the Sun and 1.25 times the Sun's radius. The abundance of elements with mass greater than hydrogen – the star's metallicity – is higher than in the Sun. AF Leporis is radiating 1.84 times the luminosity of the Sun from its photosphere at an effective temperature of 6,130 K.

== Planetary system ==
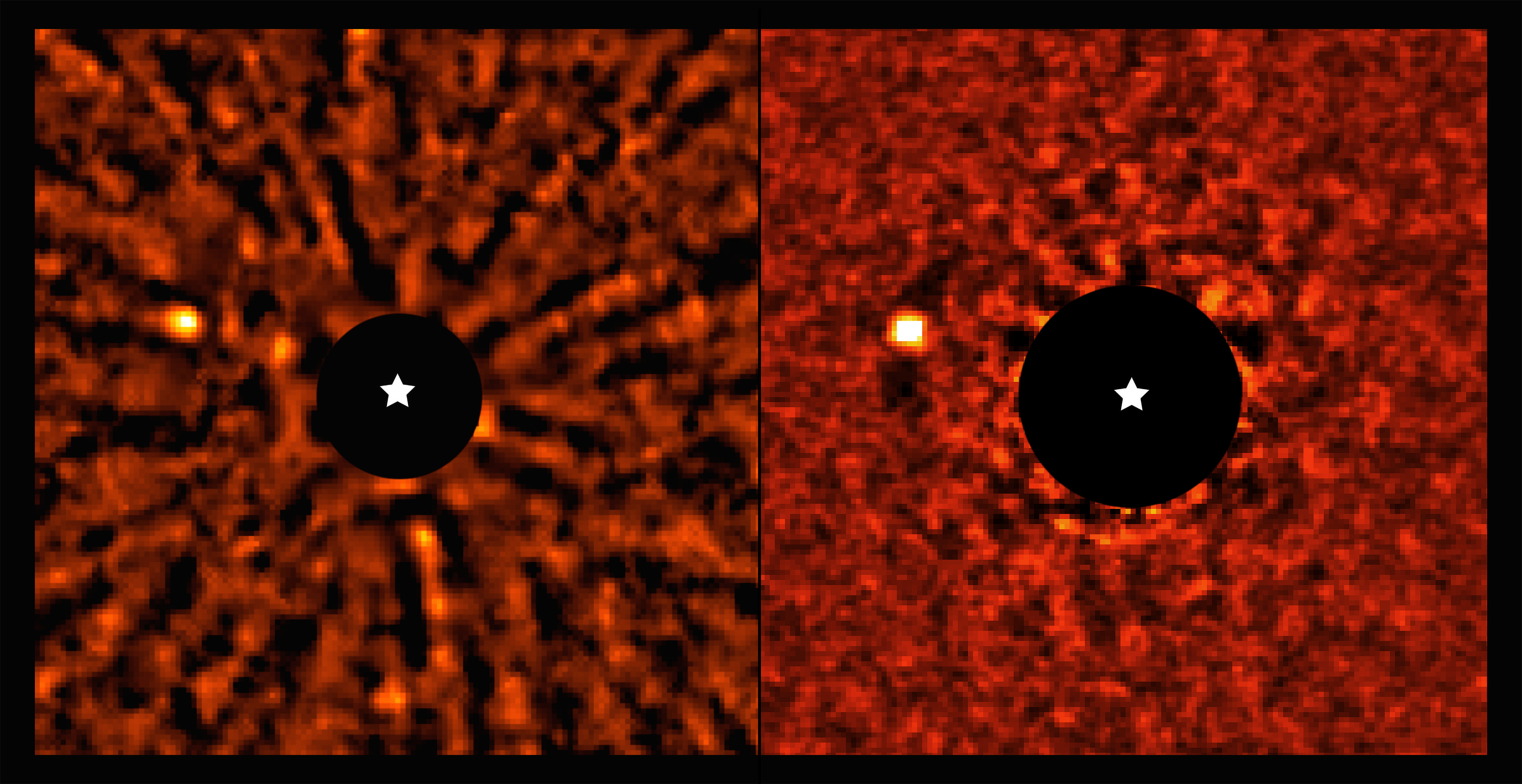
Two images of AF Lep b with the SPHERE instrument on the Very Large Telescope

In 2023, a super-Jupiter exoplanet, AF Leporis b, was discovered in orbit around AF Leporis by direct imaging using the NIRC2 instrument at the W. M. Keck Observatory and the SPHERE instrument at the Very Large Telescope. It was also detected in astrometric data from the Hipparcos and Gaia spacecraft, allowing an accurate measurement of its mass. AF Leporis b was later precovered in imaging data from 2011.

There have been multiple studies of AF Leporis b, which have found somewhat different parameters. Dynamical mass measurements range from 2.8 M_{J} to 5.5 M_{J}. Values for the planet's orbital inclination range from 50°+9°
−12° to ~98°, the former consistent with the stellar inclination of 54°+11°
−9° and suggesting an aligned system. Initial studies found a fairly eccentric orbit for the planet, but the precovery observations show that its orbit is nearly circular.

AF Leporis b has an effective temperature of about 750 K (477 °C; 890 °F), corresponding to an early-T spectral type. Spectroscopic evidence suggests that it has a metal-rich atmosphere with silicate clouds, though further studies are needed to confirm this.

AF Leporis b was observed with JWST NIRCam. The brightness of F444W is relative faint, indicating significant absorption due to carbon monoxide (CO). The strong CO absorption is explained with disequilibrium chemistry and high metallicity. The observations also rule out additional giant planets in the outer region. The study did not find any variability of AF Leporis b. A study with VLT/GRAVITY confirmed many of the previous observations. The GRAVITY instrument did add high precision astrometry, while at the same time providing a K-band spectrum. The new astrometry together with previous observations was able to constrain the orbit to a circular orbit with an inclination that is aligned with the inclination of the rotation axis of the host star. The K-band spectrum shows prominent methane (CH_{4}) absorption. The spectrum is also consistent with a metal-rich cloudy atmosphere, with [Fe/H] = 0.75±0.25, consistent with the formation via core accretion. The temperature was constrained to 800±50 Kelvin and the mass was re-estimated to 3.75 M_{J}. An observation with VLT/ERIS in the K-band detected CO and water vapor (H_{2}O), but not CH_{4} or carbon dioxide (CO_{2}). Observations with VLT/HiRISE in the H-band on the other hand confirmed the detection of CH_{4}. Observation with JWST NIRSpec did detect CO_{2}, H_{2}S, CH_{4}, CO (including ^{12}CO and ^{13}CO) and H_{2}O. These observations did reveal that AF Leporis b has a sulfur-rich atmosphere due to the large amounts of hydrogen sulfide (H_{2}S) in the atmosphere, which makes up around 10% of all sulfur in the atmosphere. The high sulfur abundance is explained with significant accretion of solids from the circumstellar disk during the formation. The carbon abundance is low compared to other elements, meaning AF Leporis b formed within the CO snow line, but beyond the H_{2}O snow line. The researchers estimate that the planet contains 56±7 M_{🜨} of solids. T-dwarfs do often have silicate clouds and the models favour enstatie (MgSiO_{3}) clouds, but mid-infrared spectroscopy is needed to confidently determine the cloud species.

A 2025 study assessed the feasibility of detecting exomoons by astrometry (i.e., from variations in the motion of a moon's host planet) around several directly imaged exoplanets with VLTI/GRAVITY. For AF Leporis b, it would theoretically be possible to detect a 0.14 M_{J} satellite orbiting at 0.39 AU, while a non-detection would rule out the existence of such a satellite.

The AF Leporis planetary system (Note: Mass, semimajor axis, eccentricity: Bonse et al. (2025) Radius and inclination: Balmer et al. (2024) Orbital period: Denis et al. (2025) Debris disk: Pearce et al. (2022))
Companion (in order from star)	Mass	Semimajor axis (AU)	Orbital period (years)	Eccentricity	Inclination (°)	Radius
b	3.74+0.53 −0.50 M_{J}	9.01+0.20 −0.19	24.38+1.1 −0.41	0.031+0.027 −0.020	57.5+0.6 −0.7	1.30±0.15 R_{J}
Debris disk	46±9 AU				—	—

== See also ==
- 51 Eridani
- Beta Pictoris
