= Lambda Boötis star =

Peculiar star with unusually low amount of iron

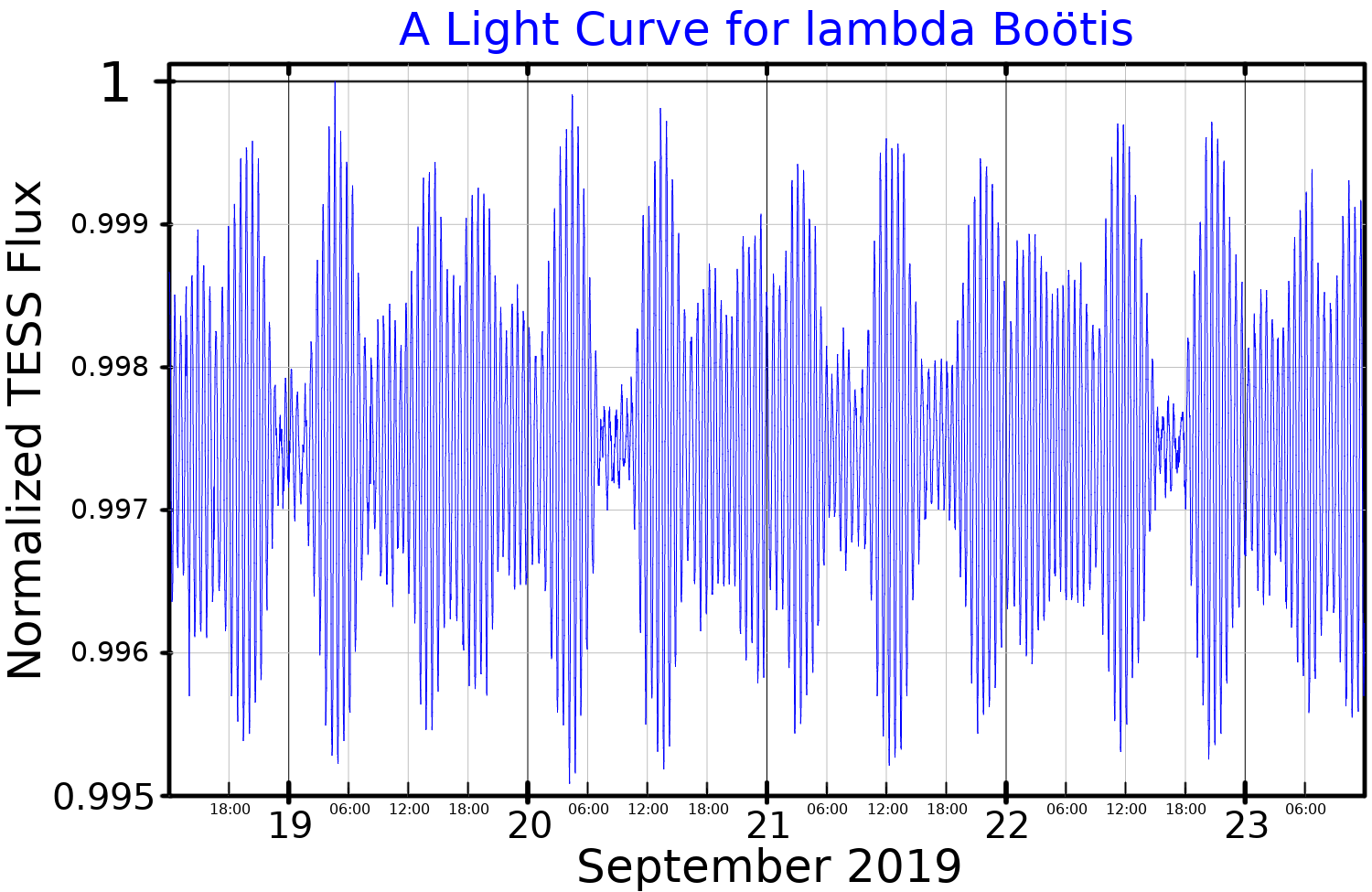
A light curve for Lambda Boötis, plotted from TESS data

A Lambda Boötis star is a type of chemically peculiar star which has an unusually low abundance of iron peak elements in its surface layers. One possible explanation for this is that it is the result of accretion of metal-poor gas from a circumstellar disc, and a second possibility is the accretion of material from a hot Jupiter suffering from mass loss. The prototype is Lambda Boötis.
