= Cygnus in Chinese astronomy =

According to traditional Chinese uranography, the modern constellation Cygnus is located within the northern quadrant of the sky, which is symbolized as the Black Tortoise of the North (北方玄武, Běi Fāng Xuán Wǔ).

The name of the western constellation in modern Chinese is 天鵝座 (tiān é zuò), meaning "the swan constellation".

== Stars ==
The map of Chinese constellation in constellation Cygnus area consists of :

Four Symbols	Mansion (Chinese name)	Romanization	Translation	Asterisms (Chinese name)	Romanization	Translation	Western star name	Proper Name	Chinese star name	Romanization	Translation
Black Tortoise of the North (北方玄武)	牛	Niú	Ox	輦道	Niǎndào	Imperial Passageway					
Black Tortoise of the North (北方玄武)	牛	Niú	Ox	輦道	Niǎndào	Imperial Passageway	4 Cyg		輦道四	Niǎndàosì	4th star
Black Tortoise of the North (北方玄武)	牛	Niú	Ox	輦道	Niǎndào	Imperial Passageway	17 Cyg		輦道五	Niǎndàowu	5th star
Black Tortoise of the North (北方玄武)	牛	Niú	Ox	輦道	Niǎndào	Imperial Passageway	11 Cyg		輦道增三	Niǎndàozēngsān	3rd additional star
Black Tortoise of the North (北方玄武)	牛	Niú	Ox	輦道	Niǎndào	Imperial Passageway	15 Cyg		輦道增四	Niǎndàozēngsì	4th additional star
Black Tortoise of the North (北方玄武)	牛	Niú	Ox	輦道	Niǎndào	Imperial Passageway	η Cyg	Almighzal	輦道增五	Niǎndàozēngwǔ	5th additional star
Black Tortoise of the North (北方玄武)	牛	Niú	Ox	輦道	Niǎndào	Imperial Passageway	φ Cyg		輦道增六	Niǎndàozēngliù	6th additional star
Black Tortoise of the North (北方玄武)	牛	Niú	Ox	輦道	Niǎndào	Imperial Passageway	β Cyg	Albireo	輦道增七	Niǎndàozēngqī	7th additional star
Black Tortoise of the North (北方玄武)	牛	Niú	Ox	輦道	Niǎndào	Imperial Passageway	2 Cyg		輦道增八	Niǎndàozēngbā	8th additional star
Black Tortoise of the North (北方玄武)	牛	Niú	Ox	輦道	Niǎndào	Imperial Passageway	8 Cyg		輦道增九	Niǎndàozēngjiǔ	9th additional star
Black Tortoise of the North (北方玄武)	女	Nǚ	Girl	天津	Tiānjīn	Celestial Ford					
Black Tortoise of the North (北方玄武)	女	Nǚ	Girl	天津	Tiānjīn	Celestial Ford	γ Cyg	Sadr			
Black Tortoise of the North (北方玄武)	女	Nǚ	Girl	天津	Tiānjīn	Celestial Ford	γ Cyg	Sadr	天津一	Tiānjīnyī	1st star
Black Tortoise of the North (北方玄武)	女	Nǚ	Girl	天津	Tiānjīn	Celestial Ford	γ Cyg	Sadr	天津西第二星	Tiānjīxīdìèrxīng	2nd western star
Black Tortoise of the North (北方玄武)	女	Nǚ	Girl	天津	Tiānjīn	Celestial Ford	δ Cyg	Fawaris (for component A)			
Black Tortoise of the North (北方玄武)	女	Nǚ	Girl	天津	Tiānjīn	Celestial Ford	δ Cyg	Fawaris (for component A)	天津二	Tiānjīnèr	2nd star
Black Tortoise of the North (北方玄武)	女	Nǚ	Girl	天津	Tiānjīn	Celestial Ford	δ Cyg	Fawaris (for component A)	天津西第一星	Tiānjīxīdìyīxīng	1st western star
Black Tortoise of the North (北方玄武)	女	Nǚ	Girl	天津	Tiānjīn	Celestial Ford	30 Cyg		天津三	Tiānjīnsān	3rd star
Black Tortoise of the North (北方玄武)	女	Nǚ	Girl	天津	Tiānjīn	Celestial Ford	α Cyg	Deneb			
Black Tortoise of the North (北方玄武)	女	Nǚ	Girl	天津	Tiānjīn	Celestial Ford	α Cyg	Deneb	天津四	Tiānjīnsì	4th star
Black Tortoise of the North (北方玄武)	女	Nǚ	Girl	天津	Tiānjīn	Celestial Ford	α Cyg	Deneb	天津东第一星	Tiānjīdōngdìyīxīng	1st eastern star
Black Tortoise of the North (北方玄武)	女	Nǚ	Girl	天津	Tiānjīn	Celestial Ford	ν Cyg		天津五	Tiānjīnwu	5th star
Black Tortoise of the North (北方玄武)	女	Nǚ	Girl	天津	Tiānjīn	Celestial Ford	τ Cyg	Enduri Senggu	天津六	Tiānjīnliù	6th star
Black Tortoise of the North (北方玄武)	女	Nǚ	Girl	天津	Tiānjīn	Celestial Ford	υ Cyg		天津七	Tiānjīnqī	7th star
Black Tortoise of the North (北方玄武)	女	Nǚ	Girl	天津	Tiānjīn	Celestial Ford	ζ Cyg	Tianjinnan	天津八	Tiānjīnbā	8th star
Black Tortoise of the North (北方玄武)	女	Nǚ	Girl	天津	Tiānjīn	Celestial Ford	ε Cyg	Aljanah (for component Aa)			
Black Tortoise of the North (北方玄武)	女	Nǚ	Girl	天津	Tiānjīn	Celestial Ford	ε Cyg	Aljanah (for component Aa)	天津九	Tiānjīnjiǔ	9th
Black Tortoise of the North (北方玄武)	女	Nǚ	Girl	天津	Tiānjīn	Celestial Ford	ε Cyg	Aljanah (for component Aa)	天津西第三星	Tiānjīxīdìsānxīng	3rd western star
Black Tortoise of the North (北方玄武)	女	Nǚ	Girl	天津	Tiānjīn	Celestial Ford	14 Cyg		天津增一	Tiānjīnzēngyī	1st additional star
Black Tortoise of the North (北方玄武)	女	Nǚ	Girl	天津	Tiānjīn	Celestial Ford	19 Cyg		天津增二	Tiānjīnzēngèr	2nd additional star
Black Tortoise of the North (北方玄武)	女	Nǚ	Girl	天津	Tiānjīn	Celestial Ford	22 Cyg		天津增三	Tiānjīnzēngsān	3rd additional star
Black Tortoise of the North (北方玄武)	女	Nǚ	Girl	天津	Tiānjīn	Celestial Ford	25 Cyg		天津增四	Tiānjīnzēngsì	4th additional star
Black Tortoise of the North (北方玄武)	女	Nǚ	Girl	天津	Tiānjīn	Celestial Ford	27 Cyg		天津增五	Tiānjīnzēngwǔ	5th additional star
Black Tortoise of the North (北方玄武)	女	Nǚ	Girl	天津	Tiānjīn	Celestial Ford	28 Cyg		天津增六	Tiānjīnzēngliù	6th additional star
Black Tortoise of the North (北方玄武)	女	Nǚ	Girl	天津	Tiānjīn	Celestial Ford	29 Cyg		天津增七	Tiānjīnzēngqī	7th additional star
Black Tortoise of the North (北方玄武)	女	Nǚ	Girl	天津	Tiānjīn	Celestial Ford	36 Cyg		天津增八	Tiānjīnzēngbā	8th additional star
Black Tortoise of the North (北方玄武)	女	Nǚ	Girl	天津	Tiānjīn	Celestial Ford	34 Cyg		天津增九	Tiānjīnzēngjiǔ	9th additional star
Black Tortoise of the North (北方玄武)	女	Nǚ	Girl	天津	Tiānjīn	Celestial Ford	40 Cyg		天津增十	Tiānjīnzēngshí	10th additional star
Black Tortoise of the North (北方玄武)	女	Nǚ	Girl	天津	Tiānjīn	Celestial Ford	44 Cyg		天津增十一	Tiānjīnzēngshíyī	11th additional star
Black Tortoise of the North (北方玄武)	女	Nǚ	Girl	天津	Tiānjīn	Celestial Ford	42 Cyg		天津增十二	Tiānjīnzēngshíèr	12th additional star
Black Tortoise of the North (北方玄武)	女	Nǚ	Girl	天津	Tiānjīn	Celestial Ford	47 Cyg		天津增十三	Tiānjīnzēngshísān	13th additional star
Black Tortoise of the North (北方玄武)	女	Nǚ	Girl	天津	Tiānjīn	Celestial Ford	35 Cyg		天津增十四	Tiānjīnzēngshísì	14th additional star
Black Tortoise of the North (北方玄武)	女	Nǚ	Girl	天津	Tiānjīn	Celestial Ford	39 Cyg		天津增十五	Tiānjīnzēngshíwǔ	15th additional star
Black Tortoise of the North (北方玄武)	女	Nǚ	Girl	天津	Tiānjīn	Celestial Ford	41 Cyg		天津增十六	Tiānjīnzēngshíliù	16th additional star
Black Tortoise of the North (北方玄武)	女	Nǚ	Girl	天津	Tiānjīn	Celestial Ford	48 Cyg		天津增十七	Tiānjīnzēngshíqī	17th additional star
Black Tortoise of the North (北方玄武)	女	Nǚ	Girl	天津	Tiānjīn	Celestial Ford	49 Cyg		天津增十八	Tiānjīnzēngshíbā	18th additional star
Black Tortoise of the North (北方玄武)	女	Nǚ	Girl	天津	Tiānjīn	Celestial Ford	52 Cyg		天津增十九	Tiānjīnzēngshíjiǔ	19th additional star
Black Tortoise of the North (北方玄武)	女	Nǚ	Girl	天津	Tiānjīn	Celestial Ford	69 Cyg		天津增二十六	Tiānjīnzēngèrshíliù	26th additional star
Black Tortoise of the North (北方玄武)	女	Nǚ	Girl	天津	Tiānjīn	Celestial Ford	70 Cyg		天津增二十七	Tiānjīnzēngèrshíqī	27th additional star
Black Tortoise of the North (北方玄武)	女	Nǚ	Girl	天津	Tiānjīn	Celestial Ford	σ Cyg		天津增二十八	Tiānjīnzēngèrshíbā	28th additional star
Black Tortoise of the North (北方玄武)	女	Nǚ	Girl	天津	Tiānjīn	Celestial Ford	61 Cyg		天津增二十九	Tiānjīnzēngèrshíjiǔ	29th additional star
Black Tortoise of the North (北方玄武)	女	Nǚ	Girl	天津	Tiānjīn	Celestial Ford	λ Cyg		天津增三十	Tiānjīnzēngsānshí	30th additional star
Black Tortoise of the North (北方玄武)	女	Nǚ	Girl	天津	Tiānjīn	Celestial Ford	56 Cyg		天津增三十一	Tiānjīnzēngsānshíyī	31st additional star
Black Tortoise of the North (北方玄武)	女	Nǚ	Girl	天津	Tiānjīn	Celestial Ford	57 Cyg		天津增三十二	Tiānjīnzēngsānshíèr	32nd additional star
Black Tortoise of the North (北方玄武)	女	Nǚ	Girl	天津	Tiānjīn	Celestial Ford	55 Cyg		天津增三十三	Tiānjīnzēngsānshísān	33rd additional star
Black Tortoise of the North (北方玄武)	女	Nǚ	Girl	天津	Tiānjīn	Celestial Ford	ω² Cyg		天津增三十四	Tiānjīnzēngsānshísì	34th additional star
Black Tortoise of the North (北方玄武)	女	Nǚ	Girl	天津	Tiānjīn	Celestial Ford	ο² Cyg		天津增三十七	Tiānjīnzēngsānshíqī	37th additional star
Black Tortoise of the North (北方玄武)	女	Nǚ	Girl	天津	Tiānjīn	Celestial Ford	ο1 Cyg		天津增三十八	Tiānjīnzēngsānshíbā	38th additional star
Black Tortoise of the North (北方玄武)	女	Nǚ	Girl	奚仲	Xīzhòng	Xi Zhong					
Black Tortoise of the North (北方玄武)	女	Nǚ	Girl	奚仲	Xīzhòng	Xi Zhong	κ Cyg		奚仲一	Xīzhòngyī	1st star
Black Tortoise of the North (北方玄武)	女	Nǚ	Girl	奚仲	Xīzhòng	Xi Zhong	ι Cyg		奚仲二	Xīzhòngyīèr	2nd star
Black Tortoise of the North (北方玄武)	女	Nǚ	Girl	奚仲	Xīzhòng	Xi Zhong	θ Cyg		奚仲三	Xīzhòngsān	3rd star
Black Tortoise of the North (北方玄武)	女	Nǚ	Girl	奚仲	Xīzhòng	Xi Zhong	16 Cyg		奚仲四	Xīzhòngsì	4th star
Black Tortoise of the North (北方玄武)	女	Nǚ	Girl	奚仲	Xīzhòng	Xi Zhong	7 Cyg		奚仲增一	Xīzhòngzēngyī	1st additional star
Black Tortoise of the North (北方玄武)	女	Nǚ	Girl	奚仲	Xīzhòng	Xi Zhong	20 Cyg		奚仲增二	Xīzhòngzēngèr	2nd additional star
Black Tortoise of the North (北方玄武)	女	Nǚ	Girl	奚仲	Xīzhòng	Xi Zhong	26 Cyg		奚仲增三	Xīzhòngzēngsān	3rd additional star
Black Tortoise of the North (北方玄武)	女	Nǚ	Girl	奚仲	Xīzhòng	Xi Zhong	33 Cyg		奚仲增四	Xīzhòngzēngsì	4th additional star
Black Tortoise of the North (北方玄武)	女	Nǚ	Girl	奚仲	Xīzhòng	Xi Zhong	HD 189276		奚仲增五	Xīzhòngzēngwǔ	5th additional star
Black Tortoise of the North (北方玄武)	女	Nǚ	Girl	奚仲	Xīzhòng	Xi Zhong	23 Cyg		奚仲增六	Xīzhòngzēngliù	6th additional star
Black Tortoise of the North (北方玄武)	危	Wēi	Rooftop								
Black Tortoise of the North (北方玄武)	危	Wēi	Rooftop	臼	Jiù	Mortar	μ^{1} Cyg		臼一	Jiùyī	1st star
Black Tortoise of the North (北方玄武)	危	Wēi	Rooftop	車府	Chēfǔ	Big Yard for Chariots					
Black Tortoise of the North (北方玄武)	危	Wēi	Rooftop	車府	Chēfǔ	Big Yard for Chariots	ρ Cyg		車府四	Chēfǔsì	4th star
Black Tortoise of the North (北方玄武)	危	Wēi	Rooftop	車府	Chēfǔ	Big Yard for Chariots	59 Cyg		車府五	Chēfǔwǔ	5th star
Black Tortoise of the North (北方玄武)	危	Wēi	Rooftop	車府	Chēfǔ	Big Yard for Chariots	ξ Cyg		車府六	Chēfǔliù	6th star
Black Tortoise of the North (北方玄武)	危	Wēi	Rooftop	車府	Chēfǔ	Big Yard for Chariots	74 Cyg		車府七	Chēfǔqī	7th star
Black Tortoise of the North (北方玄武)	危	Wēi	Rooftop	車府	Chēfǔ	Big Yard for Chariots	51 Cyg		車府增一	Chēfǔzēngyī	1st additional star
Black Tortoise of the North (北方玄武)	危	Wēi	Rooftop	車府	Chēfǔ	Big Yard for Chariots	60 Cyg		車府增二	Chēfǔzēngèr	2nd additional star
Black Tortoise of the North (北方玄武)	危	Wēi	Rooftop	車府	Chēfǔ	Big Yard for Chariots	63 Cyg		車府增三	Chēfǔzēngsān	3rd additional star
Black Tortoise of the North (北方玄武)	危	Wēi	Rooftop	車府	Chēfǔ	Big Yard for Chariots	75 Cyg		車府增五	Chēfǔzēngwǔ	5th additional star
Black Tortoise of the North (北方玄武)	危	Wēi	Rooftop	車府	Chēfǔ	Big Yard for Chariots	77 Cyg		車府增六	Chēfǔzēngliù	6th additional star
Black Tortoise of the North (北方玄武)	危	Wēi	Rooftop	車府	Chēfǔ	Big Yard for Chariots	76 Cyg		車府增七	Chēfǔzēngqī	7th additional star
Black Tortoise of the North (北方玄武)	危	Wēi	Rooftop	車府	Chēfǔ	Big Yard for Chariots	72 Cyg		車府增八	Chēfǔzēngbā	8th additional star
Black Tortoise of the North (北方玄武)	室	Shì	Encampment	騰蛇	Téngshé	Flying Serpent					
Black Tortoise of the North (北方玄武)	室	Shì	Encampment	騰蛇	Téngshé	Flying Serpent	π^{2} Cyg		螣蛇三	Téngshésān	3rd star
Black Tortoise of the North (北方玄武)	室	Shì	Encampment	騰蛇	Téngshé	Flying Serpent	π^{1} Cyg	Azelfafage	螣蛇四	Téngshésì	4th star

== See also ==
- Traditional Chinese star names
- Chinese constellations
