= F Cygni =

The Bayer designation f Cygni is shared by two stars in the constellation Cygnus:

- f^{1} Cygni, a Be star
- f^{2} Cygni, a K-type supergiant
