= Omicron Cygni =

The Bayer designation Omicron Cygni (ο Cyg / ο Cygni) is shared by two or three star systems in the constellation Cygnus. Application of the superscripts to the three stars varies in different publications; the Flamsteed designations are unambiguous:

- ο^{1} Cygni: 31 Cygni, sometimes 30 Cygni
- ο^{2} Cygni: 32 Cygni, sometimes 31 Cygni
- ο^{3} Cygni: sometimes 32 Cygni
