= NGC 6940 =

Open cluster in the constellation Vulpecula

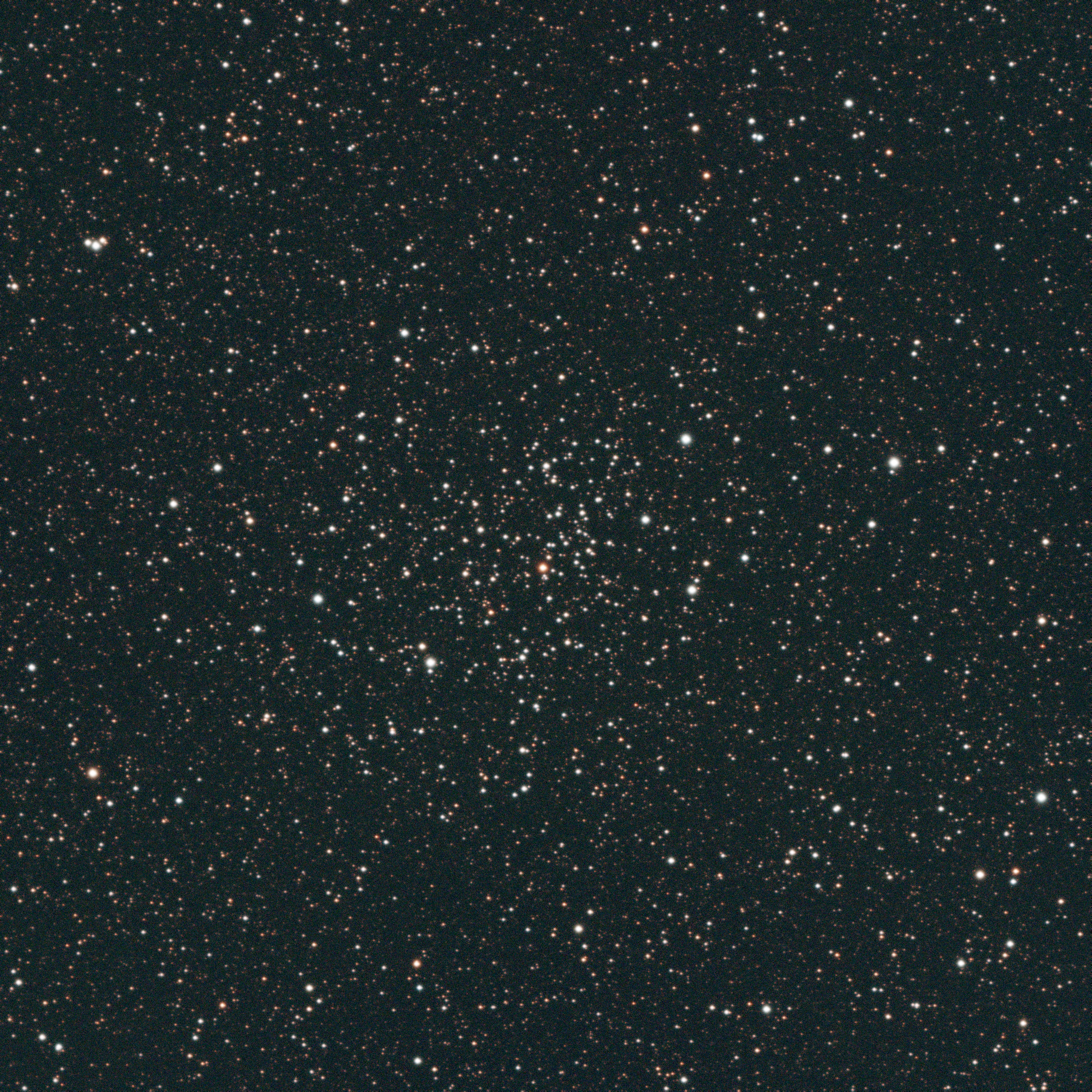
- NGC 6940 imaged in 2026

Observation data (J2000 epoch)
- Right ascension: 20^{h} 34^{m} 26^{s}
- Declination: +28° 17′ 00″
- Distance: 2,510 ly (770 pc)
- Apparent magnitude (V): 6.3
- Apparent dimensions (V): 25'

Physical characteristics
- Estimated age: 720 millions years
- Other designations: Melotte 232

Associations
- Constellation: Vulpecula

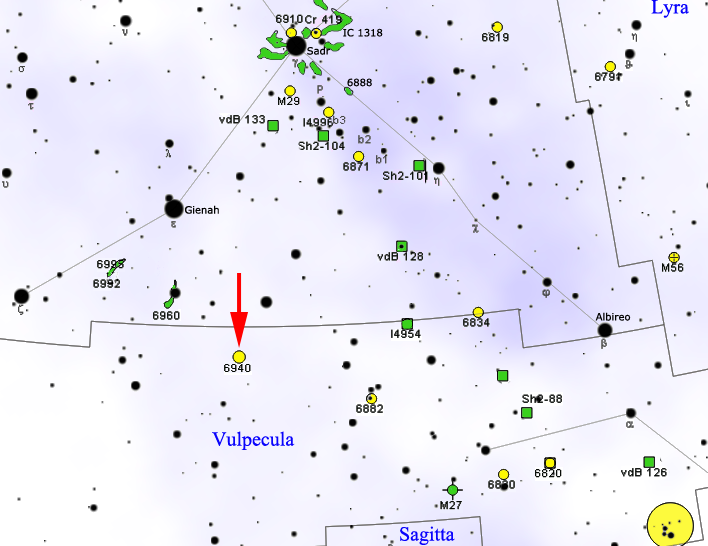
The location of NGC 6940

NGC 6940 is an open cluster in the constellation Vulpecula. It was discovered by William Herschel in 1784. The cluster is nearly a billion years old and it is located 2,500 light years away. It is considered the finest open cluster in the constellation.

== Observations ==
It is located a bit more than two degrees south-southeast of 41 Cygni and three and a half degrees southwest from 52 Cygni. The cluster is bright enough to be seen even with small binoculars, which can partially resolve it. NGC 6940 is included in the Herschel 400 Catalogue.

== Characteristics ==
NGC 6940 has hundreds of members. The cluster is quite scattered and in between its members are also visible field stars. For example, two bright stars, an 8.6 mag B8III giant star at the NE edge and a 9.1 mag A0III giant at the SW corner of the cluster are too young to be true members of NGC 6940 and are probably background stars. The brightest star (lucida) of NGC 6940 is the red giant FG Vulpeculae, a semiregular variable star whose magnitude ranges from 9.0 to 9.5 every 80 days approximately. NGC 6940 is rich in red giants, more than 20 according to WEBDA database. Based on the spectroscopic analysis of twelve of them, the cluster age was estimated to be 1.1 billion years, with a turn-off mass of 2 M⊙. Its metallicity is close to that of the Sun. In NGC 6940 have been detected 8 variable stars whose variability is consistent with the delta Scuti variables.

A study of the cluster by ROSAT in soft X-rays revealed four sources that are identified as cluster members. One more source was attributed to a possible cluster K0 giant star member, which was later confirmed to be a cluster member. Three of these sources were identified as binary stars, from a total of six known to exist in the cluster. The luminosity of the sources was typical of RS Canum Venaticorum variables, close binaries that could retain very active coronal sources despite the age of the cluster.
