= Iota Cygni =

The Bayer designation Iota Cygni (ι Cyg / ι Cygni) is shared by two stars, in the constellation Cygnus:

- ι^{1} Cygni, dimmer (magnitude 5.75)
- ι^{2} Cygni, brighter (magnitude 3.77), often simply called ι Cyg
