= 72 Cygni =

K-type giant star in the constellation Cygnus

- Location of 72 Cygni (circled in red)

Observation data Epoch J2000 Equinox J2000
- Constellation: Cygnus
- Right ascension: 21^{h} 34^{m} 46.58574^{s}
- Declination: +38° 32′ 02.6267″
- Apparent magnitude (V): 4.87

Characteristics
- Spectral type: K0.5 III Fe0.5 or K0.5 III CN 0.5 + M5
- B−V color index: 1.092

Astrometry
Radial velocity (R_{v})	−68.12±0.11 km/s
Proper motion (μ)	RA: +113.665 mas/yr Dec.: +100.403 mas/yr
Parallax (π)	14.2468±0.1339 mas
Distance	229 ± 2 ly (70.2 ± 0.7 pc)
Absolute magnitude (M_{V})	0.62

Details
Mass	1.70 M_{☉}
Radius	14 R_{☉}
Luminosity	69 L_{☉}
Surface gravity (log g)	2.68±0.04 cgs
Temperature	4,640±25 K
Metallicity [Fe/H]	0.18 dex
Rotational velocity (v sin i)	1.4 km/s
Age	900±200 Myr

Other designations
- 72 Cyg, BD+37°4359, FK5 3722, HD 205512, HIP 106551, HR 8255, SAO 71480

Database references
SIMBAD	data

72 Cygni is a star in the northern constellation of Cygnus, located 299 light years from the Sun and a member of the Hercules stream. It is visible to the naked eye as a faint, orange-hued star with an apparent visual magnitude of 4.87. 72 Cyg is moving closer to the Earth with a heliocentric radial velocity of −68 km/s. It has a relatively high proper motion, traversing the celestial sphere at the rate of 0.154″ per year.

This is an aging giant star with a stellar classification of K0.5 III Fe0.5, where the suffix notation indicates a mild overabundance of iron in the spectrum. It has 1.7 times the mass of the Sun but has expanded to 14 times the Sun's radius. The star is radiating 69 times the Sun's luminosity from its enlarged photosphere at an effective temperature of 4,640 K.

72 Cygni has a wide companion at an angular separation of 66.1″, corresponding to a projected separation of 4,690 AU. This star has a J band (infrared) magnitude of 13.224±0.025 and a class of M5.
