= Omega2 Cygni =

Star in the constellation Cygnus

Omega^{2} Cygni
- Location of ω^{2} Cygni (circled in red)

Observation data Epoch J2000.0 Equinox J2000.0 (ICRS)
- Constellation: Cygnus
- Right ascension: 20^{h} 31^{m} 18.81655^{s}
- Declination: +49° 13′ 13.0638″
- Apparent magnitude (V): 5.5292±0.0013

Characteristics
- Evolutionary stage: AGB
- Spectral type: M2 III
- B−V color index: 1.566±0.007
- Variable type: Suspected

Astrometry
| Radial velocity (R_{v}) | −64.15±0.20 km/s |
| Proper motion (μ) | RA: +8.959 mas/yr Dec.: −32.092 mas/yr |
| Parallax (π) | 7.1833±0.0675 mas |
| Distance | 454 ± 4 ly (139 ± 1 pc) |
| Absolute magnitude (M_{V}) | +0.00 |

Details
| Mass | 1.4 M_{☉} |
| Radius | 45 R_{☉} |
| Luminosity | 398 L_{☉} |
| Surface gravity (log g) | 2.02 cgs |
| Temperature | 3,920 K |
| Metallicity [Fe/H] | −0.10 dex |

Other designations
- ω^{2} Cyg, 46 Cygni, BD+48°3154, HD 195774, HIP 101243, HR 7851, SAO 49741

Database references
| SIMBAD | data |

Omega^{2} Cygni is a solitary star in the northern constellation of Cygnus. Its name is a Bayer designation that is Latinized from ω^{2} Cygni and abbreviated Omega^{2} Cyg or ω^{2} Cyg. This star has an apparent visual magnitude of 5.5, which is faintly visible to the naked eye on a dark night. Based upon an annual parallax shift of 7.18 mas, it is located approximately 454 light years from the Sun. At that distance, the visual magnitude is diminished by an extinction factor of 0.08 due to interstellar dust.

This is a red giant star on the asymptotic giant branch, with a stellar classification of M2 III. Having exhausted the supply of hydrogen at its core, it has expanded to 45 times the Sun's radius. The star has 1.4 times the mass of the Sun, and is radiating 398 times the Sun's luminosity from its enlarged photosphere at an effective temperature of 3,920 K.

It is a suspected variable star, although the evidence is considered "doubtful or erroneous". If it does exist, the variability is small with an amplitude of 0.05 magnitude and a timescale of around 30 days. There is a 58.3% chance that this star is a member of the Hercules stream.
