= 31 Cygni =

Triple star system in the constellation Cygnus

- Location of 31 Cygni (circled)

Observation data Epoch J2000 Equinox ICRS
- Constellation: Cygnus
- 31 Cygni A
- Right ascension: 20^{h} 13^{m} 37.908^{s}
- Declination: +46° 44′ 28.76″
- Apparent magnitude (V): 3.73 to 3.89
- HD 192579
- Right ascension: 20^{h} 13^{m} 39.199^{s}
- Declination: +46° 42′ 42.70″
- Apparent magnitude (V): 6.99

Characteristics

31 Cygni A
- Spectral type: K3Ib + B2IV-V
- Variable type: Algol

HD 192579
- Evolutionary stage: main sequence
- Spectral type: B5V

Astrometry

31 Cygni A
Radial velocity (R_{v})	−7.41±0.08 km/s
Proper motion (μ)	RA: 1.744 mas/yr Dec.: 3.390 mas/yr
Parallax (π)	2.9167±0.1327 mas
Distance	1,120 ± 50 ly (340 ± 20 pc)

HD 192579
Proper motion (μ)	RA: 3.906 mas/yr Dec.: 1.978 mas/yr
Parallax (π)	2.9160±0.0336 mas
Distance	1,120 ± 10 ly (343 ± 4 pc)

Orbit
Primary	31 Cygni Aa
Name	31 Cygni Ab
Period (P)	10.301+0.030 −0.037 years
Eccentricity (e)	0.203+0.007 −0.008
Inclination (i)	101.007+28.772 −18.623°
Longitude of the node (Ω)	307.271+9.802 −11.253°
Periastron epoch (T)	1950.508+0.171 −0.129
Argument of periastron (ω) (secondary)	198.619+2.771 −1.963°
Semi-amplitude (K_{1}) (primary)	13.94±0.04 km/s
Semi-amplitude (K_{2}) (secondary)	18.0 km/s

Details

K supergiant
Mass	9.44+1.51 −1.39 M_{☉}
Radius	127 R_{☉}
Luminosity	2,512 to 2,559 L_{☉}
Temperature	4,043±170 K

B dwarf
Mass	6.475 (Note: from primary mass and mass ratio) M_{☉}
Radius	5.2±0.5 R_{☉}
Temperature	16,500+1,000 −2,000 K
Age	39.8 Myr

HD 192579
Mass	4.1 M_{☉}
Radius	3.3 R_{☉}
Luminosity	373 L_{☉}
Surface gravity (log g)	4.04 cgs
Temperature	13,949 K
Metallicity [Fe/H]	+0.68 dex

Other designations
- ο^{1} Cyg, ο^{2} Cyg, 31 Cyg, ADS 13554, WDS J20136+4644
- 31 Cygni A (HD 192577): V695 Cyg, BD+46°2882, HD 192577, HIP 99675, HR 7735, SAO 49337
- HD 192579: BD+46°2883, HD 192579, HIP 99676, SAO 49338

Database references
SIMBAD	data
- HD 192579

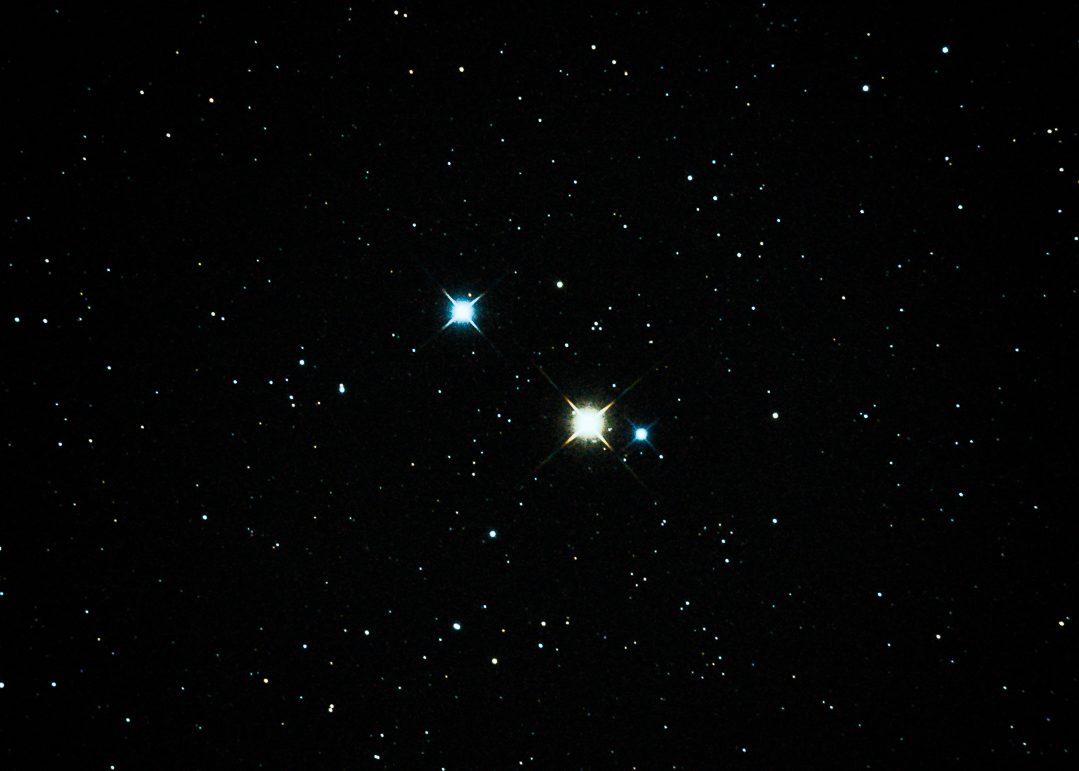
31 Cygni is the close pair, with 30 Cygni towards top left. (north is to the left)

31 Cygni is a ternary star system in the constellation of Cygnus. Alternatively, it is known as ο^{1} Cygni, Omicron^{1} Cygni, ο^{2} Cygni or V695 Cygni. Based on parallax measurements, it is located at a distance of approximately 1,120 light years.

The Bayer designation ο (omicron) has been variously applied to two or three of the stars 30, 31, and 32 Cygni. 31 Cygni has been designated, variously, as ο^{1} or ο^{2} Cygni — therefore for clarity, it is preferred to use the Flamsteed designation 31 Cygni.

31 Cygni consists of a visible pair of stars 109″ apart as of 2016, and the brighter of the two is also a spectroscopic binary. 31 Cygni A is also designated HD 192577 and HR 7735, while its 7th-magnitude visual companion is designated HD 192579. Some multiple star catalogues designate a 13th-magnitude star 36″ from 31 Cygni A as 31 Cygni B, and HD 192579 as 31 Cygni C. The 13th-magnitude star is likely to be an unrelated background object.

The spectroscopic pair are an orange supergiant of spectral type K3Ib and a blue-white star likely to be evolving off the main sequence with a spectral type of B2IV-V. The visible companion is a 7th-magnitude B5 main sequence star.

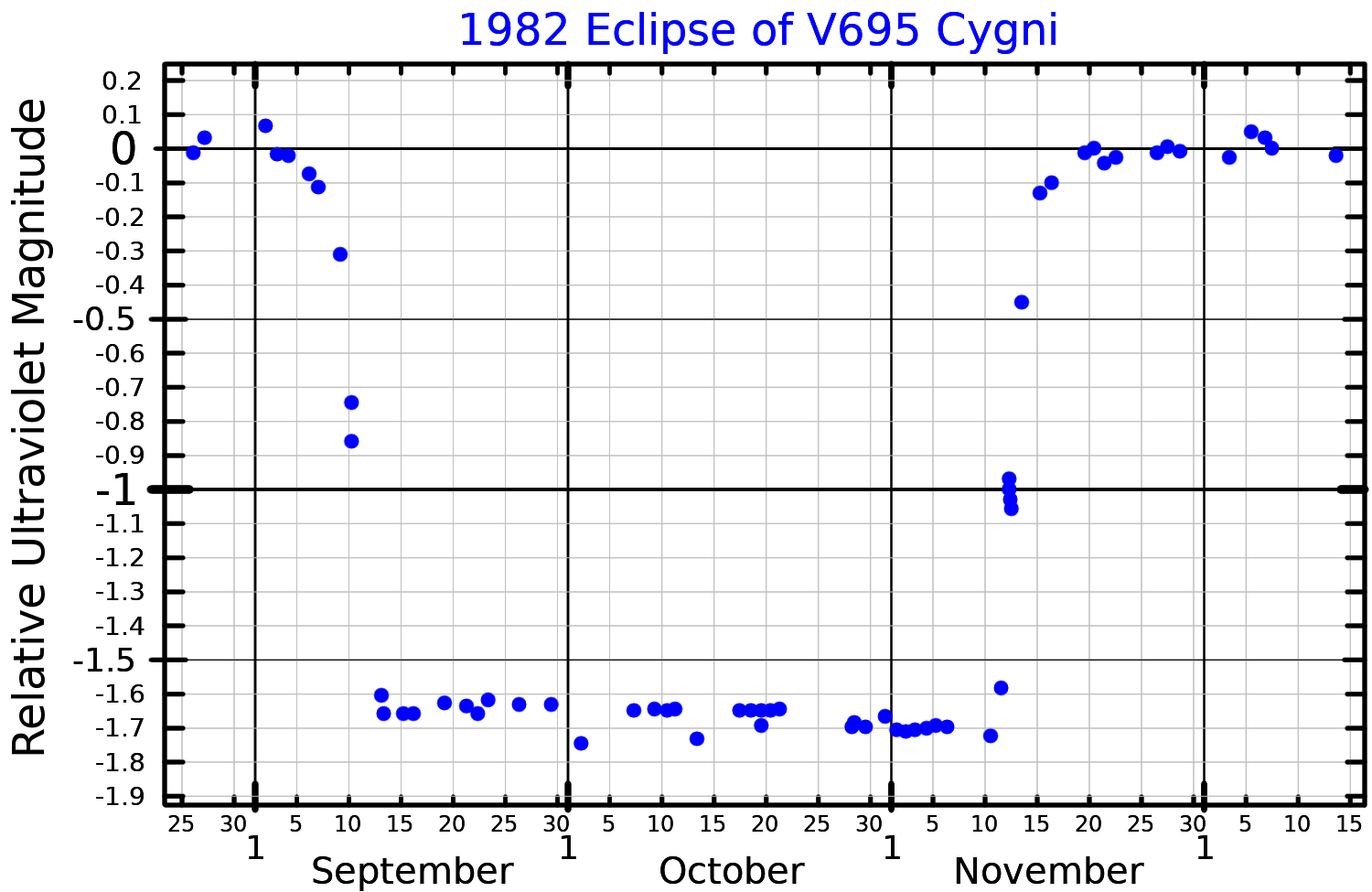
An ultraviolet band light curve for the 1982 eclipse of V695 Cygni, adapted from Stencel et al. (1984)

31 Cygni A is an Algol-type eclipsing binary and ranges between magnitudes 3.73 and 3.89 over a period of ten years. The eclipsing system has been studied in attempts to determine an accurate direct mass for a red supergiant. The value 6.73 M_{☉} is believed to be accurate to about 2%, but there are some discrepancies in the orbital fit.

30 Cygni is another naked eye star a tenth of a degree away, forming a bright triple.

32 Cygni is about a degree away to the north, also a detached eclipsing binary system. It comprises a large cool evolved star and a small hot main sequence or subgiant companion.
