= 35 Cygni =

Binary star in the constellation Cygnus

- Location of 35 Cyg (circled)

Observation data Epoch J2000 Equinox ICRS
- Constellation: Cygnus
- Right ascension: 20^{h} 18^{m} 39.06986^{s}
- Declination: +34° 58′ 57.9909″
- Apparent magnitude (V): 5.18

Characteristics
- Spectral type: F6Ib
- B−V color index: +0.62

Astrometry
Radial velocity (R_{v})	−20.20 km/s
Proper motion (μ)	RA: −0.05 mas/yr Dec.: −3.77 mas/yr
Parallax (π)	1.03±0.21 mas
Distance	approx. 3,200 ly (approx. 1,000 pc)
Absolute magnitude (M_{V})	−3.99

Details
Mass	10.0 M_{☉}
Radius	51 R_{☉}
Luminosity	7,093 L_{☉}
Surface gravity (log g)	1.5 - 2.4 cgs
Temperature	6,360 K
Metallicity [Fe/H]	0.02 dex
Rotational velocity (v sin i)	3.5 km/s
Age	22 Myr

Other designations
- 35 Cyg, HR 7770, BD+34°3967, HD 193370, SAO 69806, FK5 3627, HIP 100122

Database references
SIMBAD	data

35 Cygni is a spectroscopic binary star in the constellation Cygnus. Its apparent magnitude is 5.18. Located around 1,000 parsecs (3,300 ly) distant, its primary is a yellow supergiant of spectral type F6Ib, a massive star that has used up its core hydrogen and is now fusing heavier elements.

Yellow supergiants are usually variable, often Classical Cepheid variables, but 35 Cyg is notable for having an especially constant brightness.

35 Cyg is a single-lined spectroscopic binary with a period of 2,440 days (over 6 years). The secondary cannot be seen directly, nor can its spectral lines be identified but the overall spectrum can be match by a combination of an F4 supergiant and a less luminous B6.5 star.

It was once designated m Cygni by John Flamsteed and was included in his Atlas Coelestis, but the designation is now dropped.
