= 22 Cygni =

Star in the constellation Cygnus

Observation data Epoch J2000 Equinox J2000
- Constellation: Cygnus
- Right ascension: 19^{h} 55^{m} 51.75718^{s}
- Declination: +38° 29′ 12.154″
- Apparent magnitude (V): 4.95

Characteristics
- Spectral type: B5 IV
- B−V color index: −0.086±0.009

Astrometry
Radial velocity (R_{v})	−14.8±2.2 km/s
Proper motion (μ)	RA: +6.559 mas/yr Dec.: −0.469 mas/yr
Parallax (π)	3.0418±0.2388 mas
Distance	1,070 ± 80 ly (330 ± 30 pc)
Absolute magnitude (M_{V})	−3.18

Orbit
Period (P)	78.2±0.4 d
Eccentricity (e)	0.17±0.13
Periastron epoch (T)	2443734.5±2.1 JD
Argument of periastron (ω) (secondary)	139±11°
Semi-amplitude (K_{1}) (primary)	20.7±3.1 km/s

Details

22 Cyg A
Mass	7.9±0.4 M_{☉}
Radius	5.6 R_{☉}
Luminosity	7,305 L_{☉}
Surface gravity (log g)	3.35 cgs
Temperature	15,200 K
Rotational velocity (v sin i)	30 km/s
Age	37.3±4.2 Myr

Other designations
- 22 Cyg, BD+38°3817, HD 188892, HIP 98068, HR 7613, SAO 69101

Database references
SIMBAD	data

22 Cygni is a binary star system in the northern constellation of Cygnus. It is visible to the naked eye as a faint, blue-white hued star with an apparent visual magnitude of 4.95. The annual shift of 3.0 mas yields a distance estimate of around 1,070 light years. It is moving closer to the Earth with a heliocentric radial velocity of −15 km/s.

This is a single-lined spectroscopic binary with an orbital period of 78.2 days and an eccentricity of roughly 0.17. The visible component has a stellar classification of B5 IV that matches a B-type subgiant star. It is 37 million years old with a projected rotational velocity of 30 km/s and has an essentially solar metallicity, within the margin of error. The star has eight times the mass of the Sun and about 5.6 times the Sun's radius. It is radiating 7,305 times the Sun's luminosity from its photosphere at an effective temperature of 15,200 K.
