= HD 189276 =

Star in the constellation Cygnus

Observation data Epoch J2000.0 Equinox J2000.0
- Constellation: Cygnus
- Right ascension: 19^{h} 55^{m} 55.37920^{s}
- Declination: +58° 50′ 45.4752″
- Apparent magnitude (V): 4.98

Characteristics
- Evolutionary stage: red giant branch
- Spectral type: K4.5IIIa or K5II-III
- B−V color index: 1.584±0.011

Astrometry
Radial velocity (R_{v})	+4.26±0.34 km/s
Proper motion (μ)	RA: −8.953 mas/yr Dec.: −20.206 mas/yr
Parallax (π)	3.6680±0.0864 mas
Distance	890 ± 20 ly (273 ± 6 pc)
Absolute magnitude (M_{V})	−2.25

Details
Mass	4.05±0.56 M_{☉}
Radius	178.11 R_{☉}
Luminosity	1,533±49 L_{☉}
Surface gravity (log g)	1.70 cgs
Temperature	3,940+198 −30 K
Metallicity [Fe/H]	−0.1 dex
Rotational velocity (v sin i)	1.7 km/s

Other designations
- BD+58°2013, FK5 3591, HD 189276, HIP 98073, HR 7633, SAO 32122, 2MASS J19555536+5850454

Database references
SIMBAD	data

HD 189276 is a single star in the northern constellation Cygnus, positioned near the northern constellation border with Draco. It has an orange hue and is faintly visible to the naked eye with an apparent visual magnitude of 4.98. The star is located at a distance of approximately 820 light years from the Sun based on parallax, and it has an absolute magnitude of −2.25. It is drifting further away with a radial velocity of +4 km/s. The star has a high peculiar velocity of 38.5+1.8
−2.2 km/s and thus is a probable runaway star.

This is an aging star on the red giant branch with a stellar classification of K4.5IIIa. With the supply of hydrogen at its exhausted, it has cooled and expanded to 178 times the girth of the Sun. This is an active star that appears to be approaching the tip of the red-giant branch. Interferometric measurements of the star suggest significant departures from symmetry. HD 189276 has four times the mass of the Sun and is radiating 1,533 times the Sun's luminosity from its bloated photosphere at an effective temperature of 3,940 K.
