= 15 Cygni =

Star in the constellation Cygnus

- Location of 15 Cygni (circled in red)

Observation data Epoch J2000 Equinox ICRS
- Constellation: Cygnus
- Right ascension: 19^{h} 44^{m} 16.60522^{s}
- Declination: +37° 21′ 15.6771″
- Apparent magnitude (V): 4.90

Characteristics
- Evolutionary stage: red clump
- Spectral type: G8 III
- B−V color index: 0.931

Astrometry
Radial velocity (R_{v})	−23.62±0.21 km/s
Proper motion (μ)	RA: +72.660 mas/yr Dec.: +35.708 mas/yr
Parallax (π)	11.0063±0.1188 mas
Distance	296 ± 3 ly (90.9 ± 1.0 pc)
Absolute magnitude (M_{V})	0.19

Details
Mass	2.30 M_{☉}
Radius	12 R_{☉}
Luminosity	93.3 L_{☉}
Surface gravity (log g)	2.8 cgs
Temperature	4,920±61 K
Metallicity [Fe/H]	−0.14 dex
Rotational velocity (v sin i)	2.8 km/s
Age	1.50 Gyr

Other designations
- 15 Cyg, BD+37°3586, FK5 740, HD 186675, HIP 97118, HR 7517, SAO 68778

Database references
SIMBAD	data

15 Cygni is a single star in the northern constellation Cygnus. With an apparent visual magnitude of 4.90, it is a faint star but visible to the naked eye. The distance to 15 Cygni can be estimated from its annual parallax shift of 11.0 mas, which yields a separation of some 296 light years. It is moving closer to the Sun with a heliocentric radial velocity of −23.6 km/s.

This is an aging giant star with a stellar classification of G8 III, having consumed the hydrogen at its core and evolved off the main sequence. It is a red clump giant, which means it is generating energy via helium fusion at its core. The star is 1.50 billion years old with 2.3 times the mass of the Sun, and has expanded to 12 times the Sun's radius. It is radiating 93 times the Sun's luminosity from its enlarged photosphere at an effective temperature of 4,920 K.
