= 56 Cygni =

Star in the constellation Cygnus

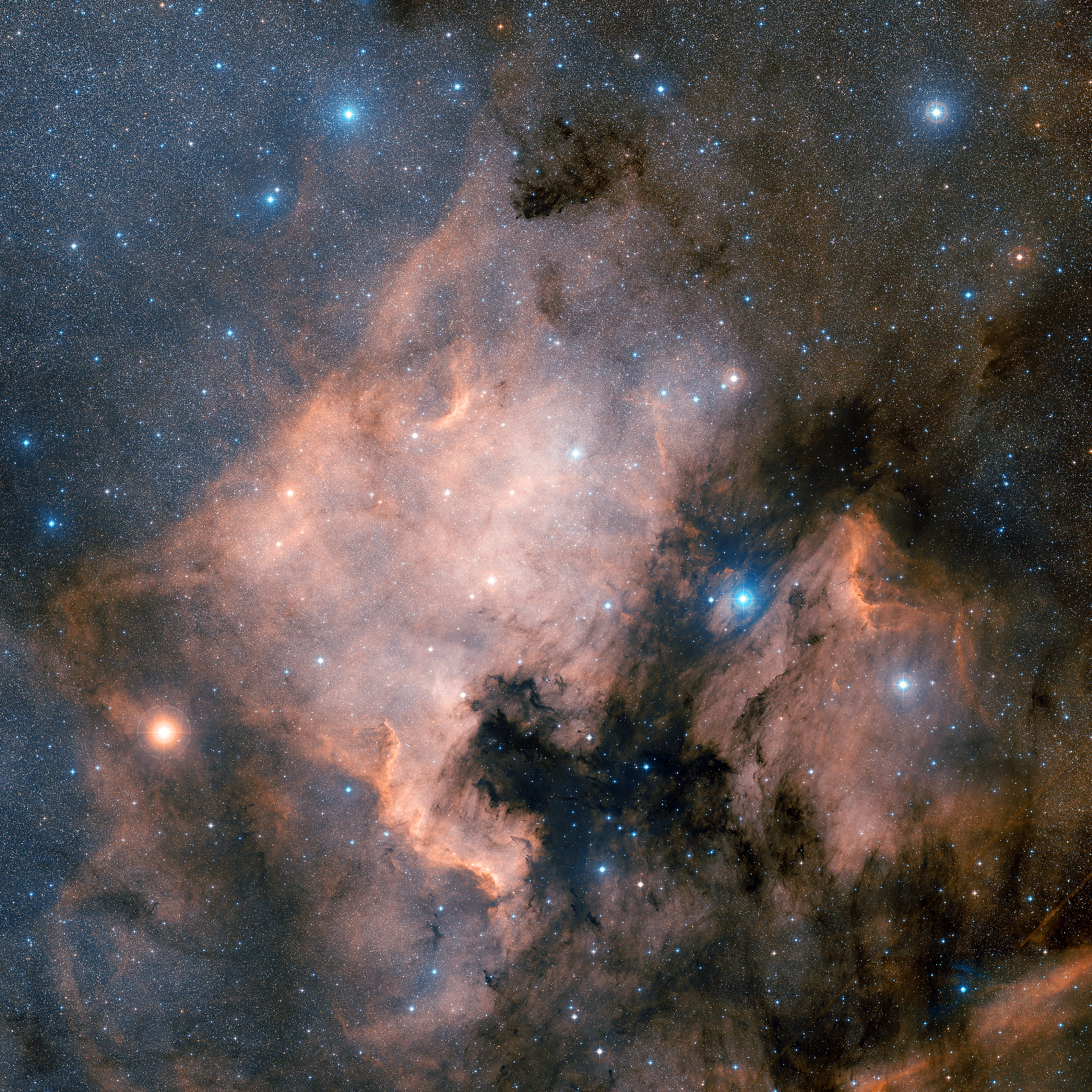
- Location of 56 Cygni (circled) in front of the Pelican Nebula

Observation data Epoch J2000 Equinox ICRS
- Constellation: Cygnus
- Right ascension: 20^{h} 50^{m} 04.93165^{s}
- Declination: +44° 03′ 33.4916″
- Apparent magnitude (V): 5.06

Characteristics
- Evolutionary stage: main sequence
- Spectral type: A6 V
- B−V color index: 0.198±0.002

Astrometry
Radial velocity (R_{v})	−21.5±3.5 km/s
Proper motion (μ)	RA: +123.197 mas/yr Dec.: +132.062 mas/yr
Parallax (π)	24.2284±0.0747 mas
Distance	134.6 ± 0.4 ly (41.3 ± 0.1 pc)
Absolute magnitude (M_{V})	2.00

Details
Mass	1.89 M_{☉}
Radius	1.92 R_{☉}
Luminosity	12.8 L_{☉}
Surface gravity (log g)	4.15±0.07 cgs
Temperature	7,895±127 K
Rotational velocity (v sin i)	73 km/s
Age	394 Myr

Other designations
- 56 Cyg, BD+43°3739, FK5 3666, HD 198639, HIP 102843, HR 7984, SAO 50121, WDS J20501+4404

Database references
SIMBAD	data

56 Cygni is a single star in the northern constellation of Cygnus, located 135 light years from Earth. It is visible to the naked eye as a white-hued star with an apparent visual magnitude of 5.06. The star is moving closer to the Earth with a heliocentric radial velocity of −21.5. It has a relatively high proper motion, traversing the celestial sphere at an angular rate of 0.181″/yr. According to Eggen (1998), this is a member of the Hyades Supercluster.

This is an A-type main-sequence star with a stellar classification of A6 V. Cowley et al. (1969) classified it as a Delta Delphini star, which is a type of suspected Am star. The star is around 394 million years old with a projected rotational velocity of 73 km/s. It has 1.9 times the mass of the Sun and is radiating 13 times the Sun's luminosity from its photosphere at an effective temperature of 7,895 K.

56 Cygni has a visual companion: a magnitude 11.9 star at an angular separation of 55.4″ along a position angle of 48°, as of 2015.
