= 57 Cygni =

Star in the constellation Cygnus

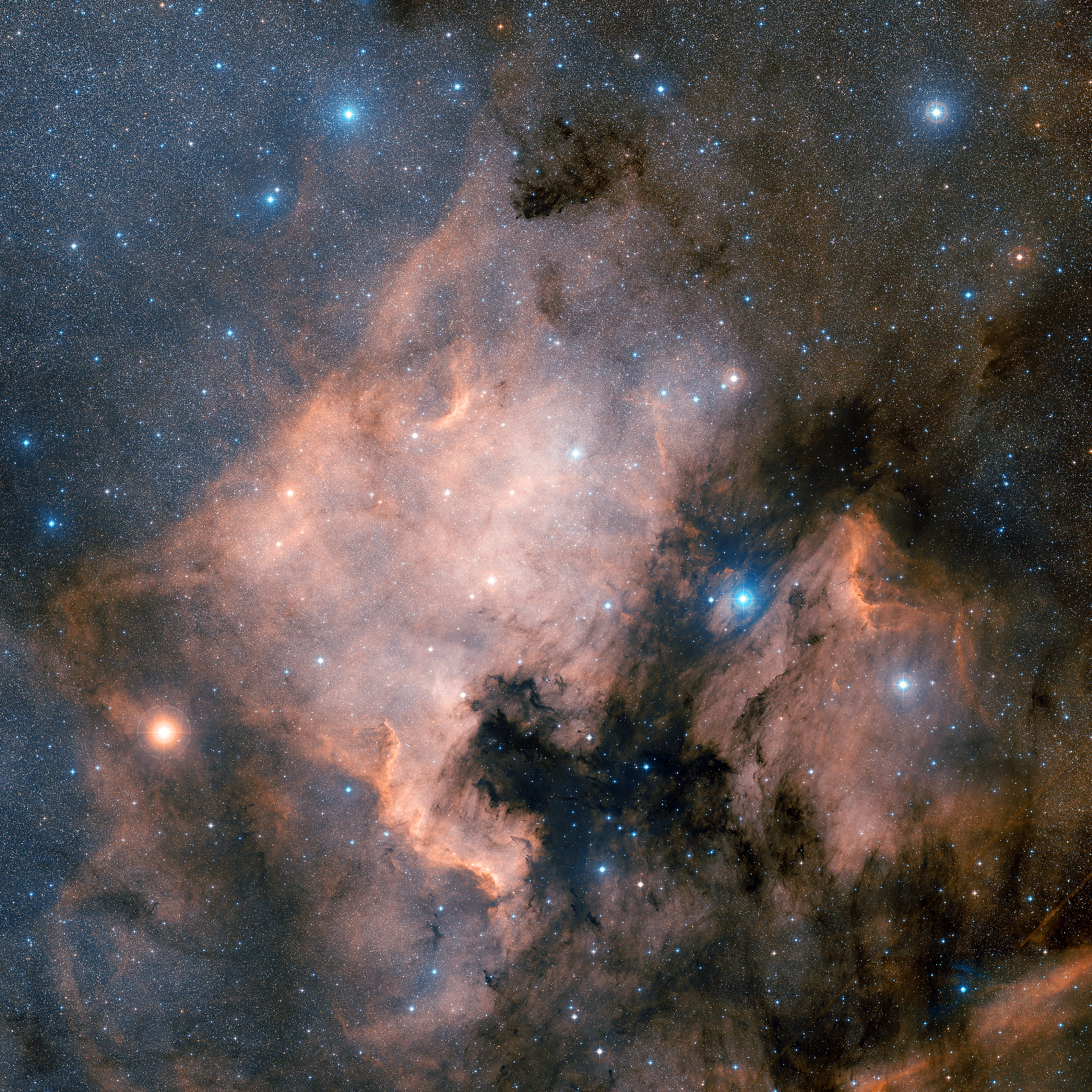
- Location of 57 Cygni (circled) in front of the Pelican Nebula

Observation data Epoch J2000 Equinox ICRS
- Constellation: Cygnus
- Right ascension: 20^{h} 53^{m} 14.75503^{s}
- Declination: +44° 23′ 14.1408″
- Apparent magnitude (V): 4.80

Characteristics
- Spectral type: B5 V
- B−V color index: −0.134±0.006

Astrometry
| Radial velocity (R_{v}) | −21.1±2.8 km/s |
| Proper motion (μ) | RA: +11.94 mas/yr Dec.: −2.08 mas/yr |
| Parallax (π) | 6.21±0.22 mas |
| Distance | 530 ± 20 ly (161 ± 6 pc) |
| Absolute magnitude (M_{V}) | −1.23 |

Orbit
| Period (P) | 2.8548 days |
| Eccentricity (e) | 0.139±0.014 |
| Inclination (i) | ≈ 48° |
| Periastron epoch (T) | 2441571.275 JD |
| Argument of periastron (ω) (secondary) | 159.6° |
| Semi-amplitude (K_{1}) (primary) | 111.9 km/s |
| Semi-amplitude (K_{2}) (secondary) | 126.0 km/s |

Details

57 Cyg A
| Mass | 5.54±0.55 M_{☉} |
| Radius | 3.3±0.4 R_{☉} |
| Temperature | 17,190 K |
| Rotational velocity (v sin i) | 40 km/s |

57 Cyg B
| Mass | 4.92±0.49 M_{☉} |
| Radius | 2.9±0.4 R_{☉} |
| Rotational velocity (v sin i) | 30 km/s |

Other designations
- 57 Cyg, BD+43°3755, HD 199081, HIP 103089, HR 8001, SAO 50180

Database references
| SIMBAD | data |

57 Cygni is a close binary star system in the constellation Cygnus, located about 530 light years from Earth. It is visible to the naked eye as a blue-white hued star with a baseline apparent visual magnitude of 4.80. The pair have a magnitude difference of 0.34. This system is moving closer to the Earth with a heliocentric radial velocity of −21 km/s.

This is a double-lined spectroscopic binary with an orbital period of 2.85 days and an eccentricity of 0.15. They show a steady change in their longitude of periastron, showing an apsidal period of 203±4 years. The system does not form an eclipsing binary, having the orbital inclination of around 48°. Both components are B-type main-sequence stars with a stellar classification of B5 V.
