= Theta Cygni =

Star in the constellation Cygnus

- Location of θ Cygni (circled)

Observation data Epoch J2000.0 Equinox ICRS
- Constellation: Cygnus
- Right ascension: 19^{h} 36^{m} 26.53436^{s}
- Declination: +50° 13′ 15.9646″
- Apparent magnitude (V): 4.490/13.03

Characteristics
- Spectral type: F3 V + M3 V
- U−B color index: −0.03
- B−V color index: +0.38

Astrometry
Radial velocity (R_{v})	−27.4 km/s
Proper motion (μ)	RA: −5.854 mas/yr Dec.: +263.660 mas/yr
Parallax (π)	54.2702±0.0860 mas
Distance	60.10 ± 0.10 ly (18.43 ± 0.03 pc)
Absolute magnitude (M_{V})	3.14

Details

θ Cyg A
Mass	1.4±0.02 M_{☉}
Radius	1.462±0.013 R_{☉}
Luminosity	4.232±0.035 L_{☉}
Surface gravity (log g)	4.254±0.01 cgs
Temperature	6853±29 K
Metallicity [Fe/H]	−0.02±0.06 dex
Rotational velocity (v sin i)	7 km/s
Age	1.0 - 1.6 Gyr

θ Cyg B
Mass	0.35 M_{☉}
Radius	0.36 R_{☉}
Luminosity	0.01 L_{☉}
Temperature	3,000 - 3,500 K

GSC 03564-00642
Radius	0.28 R_{☉}
Luminosity	0.013 L_{☉}
Temperature	3,700 K

Other designations
- θ Cyg, 13 Cyg, BD+49°3062, FK5 738, GC 27141, GJ 765, HD 185395, HIP 96441, HR 7469, SAO 31815, WDS J19364+5013A
- B: KIC 11918644, 2MASS J19362771+5013419
- GJ 765B: KIC 11918614, 2MASS J19362286+5013034
- GSC 03564-00642: KIC 11918550, 2MASS J19361440+5013096

Database references
SIMBAD	θ Cygni
- θ Cygni B
- θ Cygni C
- θ Cygni D
- GJ 765B
- GSC 03564-00642

Theta Cygni is a binary star system in the northern constellation of Cygnus. Its name is a Bayer designation, which is Latinized from θ Cygni and abbreviated θ Cyg or θ Cyg. The combined apparent visual magnitude of this system is 4.5, so it can be seen as a point of light with the naked eye in sufficiently dark skies. Based upon parallax measurements, it is located at a distance of about 60.1 light-years (18.4 pc) from the Earth. It is suspected of hosting an extrasolar planet.

== Properties ==
The spectrum of the primary star matches a stellar classification of F3 V. The luminosity class 'V' is associated with a category of stars called main sequence, which, like the Sun, are generating energy through the nuclear fusion of hydrogen at their cores. The outer envelope of this star is radiating 4.2 times the luminosity of the Sun at an effective temperature of about 6,381 K, which gives it the yellow-white hue typical of F-type stars. Theta Cygni is larger than the Sun, with about 38% more mass and a 58% greater radius. The estimated age of this star is probably in the range of 0.6–1.9 billion years.

== Companions ==
θ Cygni has several faint companions. The closest is θ Cygni B, a 13th magnitude red dwarf around 3" distant, and believed to be in orbit around 46 AU from θ Cygni. A 12th magnitude star around an arc minute distant is catalogued as component C and is believed to be an optical companion. Component D is a magnitude 12.5 star also thought to be an optical companion. GJ 765B, not to be confused with θ Cygni B, is 13th magnitude and a possible subdwarf companion. GSC 03564-00642 is another 13th magnitude red dwarf and thought to be a common proper motion companion to θ Cygni.

θ Cygni B has an apparent visual magnitude of 13.03, which is too faint to be seen without a telescope. It has a stellar classification of M3 V and an estimated mass of about 0.33 times the mass of the Sun. θ Cygni A and B are traveling together through space with a high proper motion of 0.261 arcseconds per year, or 0.4° per century. It is possible that θ Cygni B is itself a close binary containing two red dwarfs, each of which would be fainter and less massive than calculated for a single star.

== Possible planetary companion ==
Radial velocity variations of Theta Cygni have been detected by the ELODIE team while searching of extrasolar planets. Desort et al. (2009) infer these variations are not caused by a dim stellar companion roughly 80 Astronomical Units away from the star, but suggest instead the presence of a perturbing planetary object, twice as massive as Jupiter and orbiting around the primary star in roughly 150 days. This extrasolar planet has yet to be confirmed. Observations made at Lick Observatory show evidence for radial velocity variation at this period as well as at yearly aliases, however these signals have not reached statistical significance.

The Theta Cygni planetary system
Companion (in order from star)	Mass	Semimajor axis (AU)	Orbital period (days)	Eccentricity	Inclination (°)	Radius
b (unconfirmed)	≈2.3 M_{J}	0.635	154.5	0	—	—
