= 23 Cygni =

Star in the constellation Cygnus

Observation data Epoch J2000 Equinox ICRS
- Constellation: Cygnus
- Right ascension: 19^{h} 53^{m} 17.37873^{s}
- Declination: +57° 31′ 24.4810″
- Apparent magnitude (V): 5.14

Characteristics
- Spectral type: B5 V
- U−B color index: +0.76
- B−V color index: −0.13

Astrometry
Radial velocity (R_{v})	−31.6±1.6 km/s
Proper motion (μ)	RA: +5.768 mas/yr Dec.: +11.483 mas/yr
Parallax (π)	5.9155±0.1728 mas
Distance	550 ± 20 ly (169 ± 5 pc)
Absolute magnitude (M_{V})	−1.30

Details
Mass	4.7+0.64 −0.53 M_{☉}
Radius	4.30±0.45 R_{☉}
Luminosity	611.53 L_{☉}
Surface gravity (log g)	3.82±0.08 cgs
Temperature	14,893±214 K
Metallicity [Fe/H]	−0.17±0.16 dex
Rotational velocity (v sin i)	145 km/s
Age	26+32 −19 Myr

Other designations
- 23 Cyg, BD+57°2084, HD 188665, HIP 97870, HR 7608, SAO 32085, WDS J19533+5731

Database references
SIMBAD	data

23 Cygni is a single, blue-white hued star in the northern constellation Cygnus. It is a faint star, visible to the naked eye, with an apparent visual magnitude of 5.14. The distance to this star, as estimated from its annual parallax shift of 5.9 mas, is about 550 light years. It is moving closer to the Earth with a heliocentric radial velocity of −32 km/s, and is expected to come as near as 166 light-years in around 5.6 million years. At that distance, the current star would be of magnitude 2.24.

This is an ordinary B-type main-sequence star of spectral type B5V, a star that is generating energy through hydrogen fusion at its core. It is roughly 26 million years old with 4.7 times the mass of the Sun and 4.3 times the Sun's radius. The star has a high rate of spin, having a projected rotational velocity of 145 km/s. It is radiating 612 times the Sun's luminosity from its photosphere at an effective temperature of 14,893 K.
