= 26 Cygni =

Giant star in the constellation Cygnus

Observation data Epoch J2000 Equinox ICRS
- Constellation: Cygnus
- Right ascension: 20^{h} 01^{m} 21.56485^{s}
- Declination: +50° 06′ 16.8912″
- Apparent magnitude (V): 5.12

Characteristics
- Evolutionary stage: horizontal branch
- Spectral type: G8 III
- B−V color index: 1.122

Astrometry
Radial velocity (R_{v})	−0.25±0.16 km/s
Proper motion (μ)	RA: +15.520 mas/yr Dec.: +5.805 mas/yr
Parallax (π)	7.2271±0.0853 mas
Distance	451 ± 5 ly (138 ± 2 pc)
Absolute magnitude (M_{V})	−0.56

Details
Mass	2.44 M_{☉}
Radius	22.27 R_{☉}
Luminosity	204.8 L_{☉}
Surface gravity (log g)	2.50 cgs
Temperature	4,700 K
Metallicity [Fe/H]	−0.09±0.04 dex
Rotational velocity (v sin i)	3.63 km/s

Other designations
- e Cyg, 26 Cyg, BD+49°3158, HD 190147, HIP 98571, HR 7660, SAO 49098, ADS 13278, WDS J20014+5006, 2MASS J20012157+5006167

Database references
SIMBAD	data

26 Cygni is a single star in the northern constellation of Cygnus. It has the Bayer designation e Cygni, while 26 Cygni is the Flamsteed designation. This star is visible to the naked eye as a faint, yellow-hued point of light with an apparent visual magnitude of 5.12. It is located around 451 light-years (138 pc) distant from the Sun, based on parallax measurements. The radial velocity is close to negligible, being measured at −0.3 km/s.

This object is an evolved giant star with a stellar classification of G8 III; a star that has used up its core hydrogen and left the main sequence. It is most likely (88% chance) on the horizontal branch, in which case stellar modelling yields an estimated 2.44 times the mass of the Sun and 22 times the Sun's radius. It is radiating 205 times the luminosity of the Sun from its enlarged photosphere at an effective temperature of 4,700 K.

There is a magnitude 8.94 visual companion at an angular separation of 41.6″ along a position angle of 150°, as of 2014.
