= 4 Cygni =

Star in the constellation Cygnus

Observation data Epoch J2000 Equinox ICRS
- Constellation: Cygnus
- Right ascension: 19^{h} 26^{m} 09.12787^{s}
- Declination: +36° 19′ 04.4369″
- Apparent magnitude (V): 5.17

Characteristics
- Evolutionary stage: main sequence
- Spectral type: B8p Si (Fe II)
- B−V color index: −0.120±0.001
- Variable type: α^{2} CVn

Astrometry
Radial velocity (R_{v})	−22 km/s
Proper motion (μ)	RA: +3.769 mas/yr Dec.: +13.236 mas/yr
Parallax (π)	5.8357±0.1372 mas
Distance	560 ± 10 ly (171 ± 4 pc)
Absolute magnitude (M_{V})	−1.51

Orbit
Period (P)	35.0225±0.0002 d
Eccentricity (e)	0.45±0.13
Periastron epoch (T)	2438929.1±1.1 JD
Argument of periastron (ω) (secondary)	290±21°
Semi-amplitude (K_{1}) (primary)	5.7±0.6 km/s km/s

Details
Mass	4.08±0.18 M_{☉}
Radius	5.03 R_{☉}
Luminosity	501+130 −103 L_{☉}
Temperature	12,190+399 −387 K
Rotational velocity (v sin i)	30±4 km/s
Age	145 Myr

Other designations
- 4 Cyg, V1741 Cygni, BD+36°3557, FK5 3554, GC 26846, HD 183056, HIP 95556, HR 7395, SAO 68301

Database references
SIMBAD	data

4 Cygni is a binary star system in the northern constellation of Cygnus. It is a faintly visible to the naked eye with an apparent visual magnitude of 5.17. The distance to 4 Cygni, as determined from its annual parallax shift of 5.8 mas, is about 560 light years.

This is single-lined spectroscopic binary with an orbital period of 35 days and an eccentricity of 0.45. The visible component is a B-type star with a stellar classification of B8p Si (Fe II), where the suffix notation indicates this is type of chemically peculiar star known as a silicon star. It displays an overabundance of iron in the visual spectrum, while the star appears helium-weak in the ultraviolet.

John Ernest Winzer announced that 4 Cygni is a low amplitude variable star, in his 1974 Ph.D. thesis. It was given its variable star designation, V1741 Cygni, in 1981. 4 Cygni A is an Alpha^{2} Canum Venaticorum variable that varies by 0.02 magnitude over a period of 0.68674 days. The average quadratic field strength of the magnetic field is (254.7±57.2)×10^{−4} T. With an age of 145 million years, it has four times the mass of the Sun and five times the Sun's radius. It radiates around 501 times the Sun's luminosity from its photosphere at an effective temperature of 12,190 K.
