= 39 Cygni =

Star in the constellation Cygnus

- Location of 39 Cygni (circled in red)

Observation data Epoch J2000 Equinox ICRS
- Constellation: Cygnus
- Right ascension: 20^{h} 23^{m} 51.6138^{s}
- Declination: +32° 11′ 24.4816″
- Apparent magnitude (V): 4.43

Characteristics
- Evolutionary stage: horizontal branch
- Spectral type: K2.5 III Fe−0.5
- U−B color index: 1.50
- B−V color index: 1.331±0.003

Astrometry
Radial velocity (R_{v})	−14.47±0.45 km/s
Proper motion (μ)	RA: +52.762 mas/yr Dec.: +0.309 mas/yr
Parallax (π)	12.2359±0.1273 mas
Distance	267 ± 3 ly (81.7 ± 0.9 pc)
Absolute magnitude (M_{V})	0.01

Orbit
Period (P)	85.67 ± 0.89 yr
Eccentricity (e)	0.495±0.023
Periastron epoch (T)	2,453,794±174 JD
Argument of periastron (ω) (secondary)	177±7°
Semi-amplitude (K_{1}) (primary)	3.23±0.11 km/s

Details

39 Cyg A
Mass	1.9±0.1 M_{☉}
Radius	25±1 R_{☉}
Luminosity	186+14 −12 L_{☉}
Surface gravity (log g)	1.83±0.03 cgs
Temperature	4,284±125 K
Metallicity [Fe/H]	0.04 dex
Rotational velocity (v sin i)	5.6 km/s
Age	3.86±1.89 Gyr

Other designations
- 39 Cyg, BD+31°4062, FK5 3633, GC 28378, HD 194317, HIP 100587, HR 7806, SAO 69950, GSC 02676-01688

Database references
SIMBAD	data

39 Cygni is a binary star system near the southern border of the northern constellation of Cygnus, approximately 270 light years away from Earth. It is visible to the naked eye as an orange-hued star with an apparent visual magnitude of 4.43. The system is moving closer to the Sun with a heliocentric radial velocity of −15 km/s.

This is a single-lined spectroscopic binary with an orbital period of about 85.67 years (31,292 d) and an eccentricity of 0.5. The projected semi-major axis of the primary star's orbit is 1,207 ± 46 Gm (8.07 ± 0.31 AU), providing a lower bound on the separation of the stars. The system is around four billion years old.

The visible component is an evolved K-type giant star with a stellar classification of K2.5 III Fe−0.5; the suffix notation indicates a mild underabundance of iron in the spectrum. It is probably on the horizontal branch, fusing helium in its core, but may be on the red giant branch fusing hydrogen in a shell around an insert helium core. It has 1.9 times the mass of the Sun and has expanded to 25 times the Sun's radius. The star is radiating 186 times the Sun's luminosity from its enlarged photosphere at an effective temperature of 4,284 K.

The unseen secondary component is most probably a main sequence star with a type between F and mid-K, although it may be a white dwarf instead. Its mass is at least 0.7–1.0 times the mass of the Sun.

It was once designated h Cygni by John Flamsteed and was included in his Atlas Coelestis, but the designation is now dropped.
