= 75 Cygni =

Star in the constellation Cygnus

Observation data Epoch J2000 Equinox ICRS
- Constellation: Cygnus
- Right ascension: 21^{h} 40^{m} 11.10795^{s}
- Declination: +43° 16′ 25.8161″
- Apparent magnitude (V): 5.09

Characteristics
- Evolutionary stage: asymptotic giant branch
- Spectral type: M1IIIab
- B−V color index: 1.601±0.006
- Variable type: suspected

Astrometry
Radial velocity (R_{v})	−29.25±0.14 km/s
Proper motion (μ)	RA: +62.366 mas/yr Dec.: +15.488 mas/yr
Parallax (π)	7.5210±0.1706 mas
Distance	434 ± 10 ly (133 ± 3 pc)
Absolute magnitude (M_{V})	−0.36

Details
Mass	1.4 M_{☉}
Radius	46 R_{☉}
Luminosity	442 L_{☉}
Surface gravity (log g)	1.69 cgs
Temperature	3,906 K
Metallicity [Fe/H]	−0.24 dex

Other designations
- 75 Cyg, NSV 13834, AAVSO 2136+42, BD+42°4177, GC 30338, HD 206330, HIP 106999, HR 8284, SAO 51167, WDS J21402+4316

Database references
SIMBAD	data

75 Cygni is a binary star system in the northern constellation of Cygnus. It is visible to the naked eye as a dim, reddish-hued point of light with an apparent visual magnitude of 5.09. The system is located at a distance of about 434 light years from the Sun, based on parallax, and is drifting closer with a radial velocity of −29 km/s.

The pair had an angular separation of 2.7″ as of 2008, with the companion having a visual magnitude of 10.7. The brighter magnitude 5.18 primary is an aging red giant star with a stellar classification of M1IIIab. Having exhausted the supply of hydrogen at its core, it has expanded to around 46 times the radius of the Sun. It is a suspected variable star of unknown type and amplitude. The star is radiating 442 times the Sun's luminosity from its enlarged photosphere at an effective temperature of 3,906 K.

It is likely that 75 Cygni is on the asymptotic giant branch, having exhausted its core helium, but there is a chance that it might be a higher-mass star on the red giant branch, before igniting its core helium.

An optical companion, with a spectral type of K, is about an arcminute away and has an apparent magnitude of 10.14.
