= 2 Cygni =

Star in the constellation Cygnus

Observation data Epoch J2000 Equinox ICRS
- Constellation: Cygnus
- Right ascension: 19^{h} 24^{m} 07.57863^{s}
- Declination: +29° 37′ 16.7934″
- Apparent magnitude (V): 4.976

Characteristics
- Spectral type: B3 IV
- B−V color index: −0.117

Astrometry
Radial velocity (R_{v})	−23.60±2.0 km/s
Proper motion (μ)	RA: +12.022 mas/yr Dec.: +12.173 mas/yr
Parallax (π)	3.5657±0.1692 mas
Distance	910 ± 40 ly (280 ± 10 pc)
Absolute magnitude (M_{V})	−2.06

Details
Mass	7.0±0.1 M_{☉}
Radius	5.6 R_{☉}
Luminosity (bolometric)	3,354 L_{☉}
Surface gravity (log g)	3.653±0.035 cgs
Temperature	16,479±219 K
Metallicity [Fe/H]	+0.03±0.05 dex
Rotational velocity (v sin i)	137±8 km/s
Age	36.6±0.5 Myr

Other designations
- BD+29°3584, FK5 3550, GC 26785, HD 182568, HIP 95372, HR 7372, SAO 87159

Database references
SIMBAD	data

2 Cygni is a blue-white hued star in the northern constellation of Cygnus, located a few degrees from Albireo. It is a probable astrometric binary; the visible component can be viewed with the naked eye, having an apparent visual magnitude of 4.976. Based upon an annual parallax shift of 3.6 mas, it is located roughly 910 light years from Earth. It has a peculiar velocity of 23 km/s and may be a runaway star system.

The stellar classification of the primary is B3 IV, matching a B-type subgiant star. It has seven times the mass of the Sun and about 5.6 times the Sun's radius. The star is 37 million years old with a high rate of spin; it has a projected rotational velocity of 137 km/s. It is radiating 3,354 times the Sun's luminosity from its photosphere at an effective temperature of 16,479 K.

In 2024, imaging detected a candidate companion star at an angular separation of 70 mas. It appears to be a main sequence star with an estimated mass of 5.90±0.18 M_{☉}.
