= 74 Cygni =

Binary star system in the constellation Cygnus

Observation data Epoch J2000 Equinox J2000
- Constellation: Cygnus
- Right ascension: 21^{h} 36^{m} 56.97051^{s}
- Declination: +40° 25′ 48.5818″
- Apparent magnitude (V): 5.04

Characteristics
- Evolutionary stage: main sequence
- Spectral type: A3 Vn
- B−V color index: 0.198±0.003

Astrometry
Radial velocity (R_{v})	5.3±2.9 km/s
Proper motion (μ)	RA: +2.270 mas/yr Dec.: +18.399 mas/yr
Parallax (π)	13.0909±0.2893 mas
Distance	249 ± 6 ly (76 ± 2 pc)
Absolute magnitude (M_{V})	0.95

Orbit
Period (P)	574.632±9.4158 d
Semi-major axis (a)	8.56±0.91 mas
Eccentricity (e)	0.5349±0.1066
Inclination (i)	102.1±4.39°
Longitude of the node (Ω)	18.92°
Periastron epoch (T)	8579.5387±18.6175
Argument of periastron (ω) (secondary)	306.56±14.01°

Details

74 Cyg A
Mass	1.83±0.29 M_{☉}
Radius	3.68±0.13 R_{☉}
Luminosity	44±2 L_{☉}
Surface gravity (log g)	3.57±0.08 cgs
Temperature	7,757±120 K
Rotational velocity (v sin i)	201 km/s
Age	606 Myr

Other designations
- 74 Cyg, BD+39°4612, FK5 811, HD 205835, HIP 106711, HR 8266, SAO 51101, WDS J21369+4025

Database references
SIMBAD	data

74 Cygni is a visual binary star system in the northern constellation Cygnus, located around 249 light years distant from the Sun. It is visible to the naked eye as a faint, white-hued star with a combined apparent visual magnitude of 5.04. The pair orbit each other with a period of 1.57 years and an eccentricity of 0.5. The system is a source of X-ray emission, which is most likely coming from the secondary component.

The primary component is an A-type main-sequence star with a stellar classification of A3 Vn; a star that is fusing its core hydrogen. The 'n' suffix indicates "nebulous" absorption lines due to rapid rotation, with the star having a projected rotational velocity of 201 km/s. The high rate of spin is giving the star an oblate shape with an equatorial bulge that is 8% larger than the polar radius. The star has 1.83 times the mass of the Sun, 3.68 times the Sun's radius, and is radiating 44 times the Sun's luminosity from its photosphere at an effective temperature of about 7,757 K.
