= Kappa Cygni =

Star in the constellation Cygnus

- Location of κ Cygni (circled)

Observation data Epoch J2000.0 Equinox ICRS
- Constellation: Cygnus
- Right ascension: 19^{h} 17^{m} 06.168^{s}
- Declination: +53° 22′ 06.450″
- Apparent magnitude (V): 3.814

Characteristics
- Evolutionary stage: horizontal branch
- Spectral type: G9 III
- U−B color index: +0.767
- B−V color index: +0.965

Astrometry
Radial velocity (R_{v})	−29.36±0.09 km/s
Proper motion (μ)	RA: +59.476 mas/yr Dec.: +123.003 mas/yr
Parallax (π)	26.4853±0.1081 mas
Distance	123.1 ± 0.5 ly (37.8 ± 0.2 pc)
Absolute magnitude (M_{V})	+0.84

Details
Mass	2.19+0.14 −0.07 M_{☉}
Radius	8.65±0.10 R_{☉}
Luminosity	44.5±1.4 L_{☉}
Surface gravity (log g)	2.878+0.007 −0.004 cgs
Temperature	5,066+50 −47 K
Metallicity [Fe/H]	+0.06+0.10 −0.13 dex
Rotational velocity (v sin i)	1.08±0.28 km/s
Age	0.88+0.11 −0.15 Gyr

Other designations
- κ Cyg, 1 Cygni, BD+53°2216, FK5 726, GC 26621, HD 181276, HIP 94779, HR 7328, SAO 31537

Database references
SIMBAD	data

Kappa Cygni is a star in the northern constellation of Cygnus. Its name is a Bayer designation that is Latinized from κ Cygni and abbreviated Kappa Cyg or κ Cyg. This star has an apparent visual magnitude of 3.8, which is bright enough to be seen with the naked eye. Based on parallax measurements, it is located at a distance of 123 light years from the Sun. In the constellation, it forms the tip of Cygnus's left wing. The radiant of the minor Kappa Cygnids meteor shower is located about 5° north of this star.

Kappa Cygni has been reported to vary in brightness between magnitudes 3.76 and 3.82, but this has not been confirmed and it is not formally catalogued as a variable star. It is tentatively classified as a type SRd semiregular variable star with a possible period around 79 days. Hipparcos photometry indicated variability, but only by about 0.01 to 0.02 magnitudes which is potentially within the margin of error for a constant star. TESS data at two-minute intervals over a two-year period indicates variability of only 90 parts per million, but with a possible period of 0.9 days.

Examination of this star's spectrum show it to match a stellar classification of G9 III, with the 'III' luminosity class revealing that it has consumed the hydrogen fuel at its core and expanded into the giant star stage of its stellar evolution. Despite being younger than the Sun with an age of 880 million years, it has reached its current evolutionary stage because more massive stars evolve faster. Kappa Cygni has expanded to 8.65 times the Sun's radius and is glowing with 44.5 times the Sun's luminosity. The outer envelope has an effective temperature of 5,066 K, giving it the yellow-orange hue of a star near the transition from a G- to a K-type classification.
