= 33 Cygni =

Single star in the constellation Cygnus

- Location of 33 Cygni (circled in red)

Observation data Epoch J2000 Equinox J2000
- Constellation: Cygnus
- Right ascension: 20^{h} 13^{m} 23.86661^{s}
- Declination: +56° 34′ 03.7999″
- Apparent magnitude (V): 4.28

Characteristics
- Evolutionary stage: main sequence
- Spectral type: A3 IV–Vn
- B−V color index: 0.114±0.001

Astrometry
Radial velocity (R_{v})	−16.13±2.53 km/s
Proper motion (μ)	RA: +61.82 mas/yr Dec.: +82.18 mas/yr
Parallax (π)	20.48±0.12 mas
Distance	159.3 ± 0.9 ly (48.8 ± 0.3 pc)
Absolute magnitude (M_{V})	0.84

Details
Mass	2.33±0.01 M_{☉}
Radius	2.76 R_{☉}
Luminosity	44.3±1.0 L_{☉}
Temperature	8,395+97 −96 K
Rotational velocity (v sin i)	243 km/s
Age	400 Myr

Other designations
- 33 Cyg, BD+56°2376, FK5 758, HD 192696, HIP 99655, HR 7740, SAO 32378, WDS J20145+3648A

Database references
SIMBAD	data

33 Cygni is a single star located 159 light years away in the northern constellation Cygnus. It is visible to the naked eye as a white-hued star with an apparent visual magnitude of 4.28. The star is moving closer to the Earth with a heliocentric radial velocity of −16 km/s. Eggen (1995) listed it as a proper motion candidate for membership in the IC 2391 supercluster.

This star has a stellar classification of A3 IV–Vn, showing a spectrum with traits intermediate between an A-type main-sequence star and an evolving subgiant star. The 'n' suffix indicates "nebulous" absorption lines due to rapid rotation. It is about 400 million years old with a high projected rotational velocity of 243 km/s. This rate of spin is giving the star an oblate shape with a pronounced equatorial bulge that is an estimated 28% wider than the polar radius.

33 Cyg has 2.33 times the mass of the Sun and 2.76 times the Sun's radius. The star is radiating 44 times the Sun's luminosity from its photosphere at an effective temperature of 8,395 K. It displays an infrared excess that suggests an orbiting debris disk with a temperature of 500 K at a mean distance of 1.80 AU from the host star.
