= 20 Cygni =

Red giant star in the constellation Cygnus

Observation data Epoch J2000 Equinox ICRS
- Constellation: Cygnus
- Right ascension: 19^{h} 50^{m} 37.72371^{s}
- Declination: +52° 59′ 16.7901″
- Apparent magnitude (V): 5.030

Characteristics
- Spectral type: K3 III CN2
- B−V color index: 1.280

Astrometry
Radial velocity (R_{v})	−22.04±0.15 km/s
Proper motion (μ)	RA: −10.29 mas/yr Dec.: −69.68 mas/yr
Parallax (π)	16.11±0.14 mas
Distance	202 ± 2 ly (62.1 ± 0.5 pc)

Details
Mass	1.28 M_{☉}
Radius	13 R_{☉}
Luminosity	57.5 L_{☉}
Surface gravity (log g)	2.2 cgs
Temperature	4,337±67 K
Metallicity [Fe/H]	+0.14 dex
Rotational velocity (v sin i)	4.6 km/s

Other designations
- d Cyg, 20 Cyg, BD+52°2547, FK5 3586, HD 188056, HIP 97635, HR 7576, SAO 32042

Database references
SIMBAD	data

20 Cygni is a single, orange-hued star in the northern constellation of Cygnus. It is a faint star but is visible to the naked eye with an apparent visual magnitude of 5.03. The distance to 20 Cygni can be estimated from its annual parallax shift of 16 mas, which yields a range of 202 light years. It is moving closer to the Earth with a heliocentric radial velocity of −22 km/s.

This is an aging red giant star with a stellar classification of K3 III CN2, a star that has used up its core hydrogen and is expanding. The suffix notation indicates there are unusually strong lines of cyanogen in the spectrum. 20 Cyg is listed as one of the least variable stars in the Hipparcos catalogue, changing its brightness by no more than 0.01 magnitude. It has 1.28 times the mass of the Sun and has expanded to 13 times the Sun's radius. The star is radiating 57.5 times the Sun's luminosity from its enlarged photosphere at an effective temperature of 4,337 K.
