= Lambda Cygni =

Star in the constellation Cygnus

- Location of λ Cygni (circled in red)

Observation data Epoch J2000 Equinox ICRS
- Constellation: Cygnus
- Right ascension: 20^{h} 47^{m} 24.53766^{s}
- Declination: +36° 29′ 26.5737″
- Apparent magnitude (V): 4.54

Characteristics
- Spectral type: B5Ve
- U−B color index: −0.50
- B−V color index: −0.11
- Variable type: Be star

Astrometry
Radial velocity (R_{v})	-23.20 km/s
Proper motion (μ)	RA: +14.71< mas/yr Dec.: −8.96 mas/yr
Parallax (π)	4.24±0.43 mas
Distance	approx. 770 ly (approx. 240 pc)

Details

λ Cyg Aa
Mass	6.40 M_{☉}
Radius	3.56 R_{☉}
Surface gravity (log g)	3.195 cgs
Temperature	13,925 K
Rotational velocity (v sin i)	133 km/s

λ Cyg Ab
Mass	6.40 M_{☉}

λ Cyg B
Mass	5.12 M_{☉}

Other designations
- 54 Cygni, GC 28994, HD 198183, HIP 102589, HR 7963, SAO 70505, CCDM J20475+3629, WDS J20474+3629

Database references
SIMBAD	data

Lambda Cygni is a multiple star system in the northern constellation of Cygnus. Its name is a Bayer designation that is Latinized from λ Cygni and abbreviated λ Cyg or λ Cyg. With an apparent visual magnitude of 4.54, it is visible to the naked eye as a point of light. The system is located at a distance of approximately 770 light years based on parallax measurements.

Lambda Cygni is a multiple star, with components A, B, and C observed in the 19th century; the main component, A, is a spectroscopic binary itself with two components Aa and Ab reported at magnitudes 5.4 and 5.8 orbiting with a period of 12 years. Component B has type B7V, magnitude 6.26, and separation 0.77" (about 180 AU based on parallax). Component C has reported type K2III-IV, apparent magnitude 9.65, and separation about 85". Recent observations indicate the presence of additional smaller companions D (about 50" from A), E (about 8" from C), and F (about 40" from C) all around apparent magnitude 14.
