= 8 Cygni =

Star in the constellation Cygnus

- Location of 8 Cygni (circled in red)

Observation data Epoch J2000 Equinox ICRS
- Constellation: Cygnus
- Right ascension: 19^{h} 31^{m} 46.32184^{s}
- Declination: +34° 27′ 10.6874″
- Apparent magnitude (V): 4.75

Characteristics
- Spectral type: B3 IV
- B−V color index: −0.155

Astrometry
Radial velocity (R_{v})	−21.20±0.1 km/s
Proper motion (μ)	RA: 1.16 mas/yr Dec.: −3.47 mas/yr
Parallax (π)	3.79±0.16 mas
Distance	860 ± 40 ly (260 ± 10 pc)
Absolute magnitude (M_{V})	−2.21

Details
Mass	6.1 M_{☉}
Radius	6.50 R_{☉}
Luminosity	2,291 L_{☉}
Surface gravity (log g)	3.58 cgs
Temperature	16,300 K
Metallicity [Fe/H]	+0.25 dex
Rotational velocity (v sin i)	55 km/s
Age	53 Myr

Other designations
- 8 Cygni, BD+34°3590, HD 184171, HIP 96052, HR 7426, SAO 68447.

Database references
SIMBAD	data

8 Cygni is a single star in the northern constellation of Cygnus. Based upon its parallax of 3.79 mas, it is approximately 860 light-years (260 parsecs) away from Earth. It is visible to the naked eye as a faint, bluish-white hued star with an apparent visual magnitude of about 4.7. The star is moving closer to the Earth with a heliocentric radial velocity of −21 km/s.

This is an aging subgiant star, as indicated by its spectral type of B3IV. Its effective temperature of 16,300 K fits into the normal range of B-type stars: 11,000 to 25,000 K. 8 Cygni is about twice as hot as the Sun, and it is six times larger and many times brighter in comparison. The elemental abundances are near solar.
