= 30 Cygni =

Star in the constellation Cygnus

- Location of 30 Cygni (circled in red)

Observation data Epoch J2000 Equinox ICRS
- Constellation: Cygnus
- Right ascension: 20^{h} 13^{m} 18.05358^{s}
- Declination: +46° 48′ 56.4424″
- Apparent magnitude (V): 4.83 (4.81 - 4.84)

Characteristics
- Spectral type: A5IIIn
- U−B color index: +0.17
- B−V color index: +0.10
- Variable type: suspected

Astrometry
Radial velocity (R_{v})	−26.00 km/s
Proper motion (μ)	RA: +13.83 mas/yr Dec.: +3.00 mas/yr
Parallax (π)	5.34±0.33 mas
Distance	610 ± 40 ly (190 ± 10 pc)
Absolute magnitude (M_{V})	−1.55

Details
Mass	2.1 M_{☉}
Radius	9.91 R_{☉}
Luminosity	310 L_{☉}
Surface gravity (log g)	3.61 cgs
Temperature	7,893 K
Metallicity [Fe/H]	−0.55 dex
Rotational velocity (v sin i)	145 km/s

Other designations
- BD+46°2881, GC 28091, HIP 99639, HR 7730, HD 192514, SAO 49332, WDS J20136+4644D, CCDM J20135+4646D

Database references
SIMBAD	data

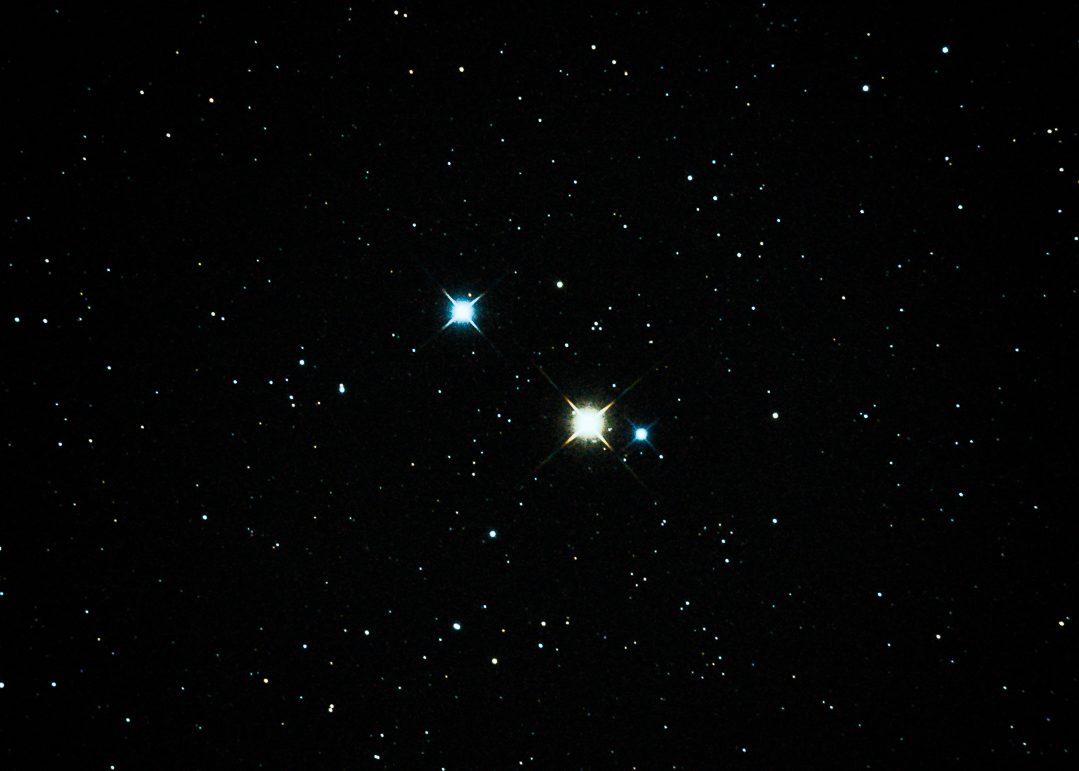
30 Cygni at top left, with 31 Cygni A and B at lower right

30 Cygni (ο^{1} Cygni) is a class A5III (white giant) star in the constellation Cygnus. Its apparent magnitude is 4.83 and it is approximately 610 light years away based on parallax.

The Bayer letter ο (omicron) has been variously applied to two or three of the stars 30, 31, and 32 Cygni. 30 Cygni has sometimes been designated as ο^{1} Cygni with the other two stars being ο^{2} and ο^{3} respectively. For clarity, it is preferred to use the Flamsteed designation 30 Cygni rather than one of the Bayer designations.

30 Cygni is about six arc-minutes from 31 Cygni A and seven arc-minutes from 31 Cygni B. That pair is known as ο^{1} Cygni, while ο^{2} Cygni is a degree away. Both ο^{1} and ο^{2} are 4th magnitude stars.
