= Iota1 Cygni =

Binary star system in the constellation Cygnus

Iota^{1} Cygni
- Location of ι^{1} Cygni (circled in red)

Observation data Epoch J2000 Equinox ICRS
- Constellation: Cygnus
- Right ascension: 19^{h} 27^{m} 25.96022^{s}
- Declination: +52° 19′ 13.5871″
- Apparent magnitude (V): 5.73

Characteristics
- Evolutionary stage: main sequence
- Spectral type: A1V
- B−V color index: −0.002±0.002

Astrometry
Radial velocity (R_{v})	+1.90 km/s
Proper motion (μ)	RA: −12.639 mas/yr Dec.: −27.567 mas/yr
Parallax (π)	8.4332±0.0867 mas
Distance	387 ± 4 ly (119 ± 1 pc)
Absolute magnitude (M_{V})	+0.57

Details
Mass	2.59±0.03 M_{☉}
Radius	3.0 R_{☉}
Luminosity	74.1+11.0 −20.5 L_{☉}
Surface gravity (log g)	4.18 cgs
Temperature	9,683+89 −178 K
Metallicity [Fe/H]	0.00 dex
Rotational velocity (v sin i)	51.6±2.2 km/s
Age	386 Myr

Other designations
- ι^{1} Cyg, 7 Cygni, BD+52°2434, HD 183534, HIP 95656, HR 7408, SAO 31673

Database references
SIMBAD	data

Iota^{1} Cygni is a probable binary star system in the northern constellation Cygnus. Its name is a Bayer designation that is Latinized from ι^{1} Cygni, and abbreviated Iota^{1} Cyg or ι^{1} Cyg. It is separated by less than a degree from its brighter visual neighbor, Iota^{2} Cygni. It is near the lower limit of visibility to the naked eye with an apparent visual magnitude of 5.75. The system is located approximately 387 light years away based on parallax, and it is drifting further away with a radial velocity of +2 km/s.

This is a candidate double-lined spectroscopic binary system. It has a stellar classification of A1V, suggesting the primary component is an A-type main-sequence star. The star is about 400 million years old with a moderate rotation rate, showing a projected rotational velocity of 52 km/s. It has 2.6 times the mass of the Sun and is radiating 74 times the Sun's luminosity from its photosphere at an effective temperature of 9,683 K.
