= Hercules stream =

Moving group of stars

The Hercules stream is a large moving group of stars that are trailing behind the local rate of galactic rotation and are heading further out in the disk relative to the galactic core. Members of this stream may sometimes be referred to as Hercules stars. This stream was first hypothesized to be the remnants of a cluster of stars that has evaporated over time, becoming gravitationally unbound. Alternatively, the Hercules stream may have been created as a resonant effect of the galactic bar at the center of the Milky Way. This stream of stars has a space velocity component V equal to about −40 km/s.
