= 41 Cygni =

Star in the constellation Cygnus

- Location of 41 Cyg (circled)

Observation data Epoch J2000 Equinox ICRS
- Constellation: Cygnus
- Right ascension: 20^{h} 29^{m} 23.73561^{s}
- Declination: +30° 22′ 06.7968″
- Apparent magnitude (V): 4.02

Characteristics
- Evolutionary stage: supergiant
- Spectral type: F5Ib-II
- B−V color index: +0.38
- Variable type: constant

Astrometry
| Radial velocity (R_{v}) | −18.20 km/s |
| Proper motion (μ) | RA: 6.89 mas/yr Dec.: −0.87 mas/yr |
| Parallax (π) | 4.24±0.16 mas |
| Distance | 770 ± 30 ly (236 ± 9 pc) |
| Absolute magnitude (M_{V}) | −3.32 |

Details
| Mass | 5.3±0.4 M_{☉} |
| Radius | 27.01+2.51 −1.01 R_{☉} |
| Luminosity | 1,197±90 L_{☉} |
| Surface gravity (log g) | 2.32±0.08 cgs |
| Temperature | 6533+126 −283 K |
| Metallicity [Fe/H] | 0.00±0.07 dex |
| Rotational velocity (v sin i) | 9.5±2.0 km/s |
| Age | 85 Myr |

Other designations
- 41 Cyg, BD+29°4057, HD 195295, HIP 101076, HR 7834, SAO 70095

Database references
| SIMBAD | data |

41 Cygni is a single star in the northern constellation of Cygnus, located near the southern border with Vulpecula. It is visible to the naked eye as a faint, yellow-white hued star with an apparent visual magnitude of 4.02. The star lies at a distance of around 770 light years from the Sun, based on parallax, and is drifting closer with a radial velocity of −18 km/s.

This is a sharp-lined supergiant star with a stellar classification of F5Ib-II. It is 85 million years old with 5.3 times the mass of the Sun and is spinning with a projected rotational velocity of 9.5 km/s. Having exhausted the supply of hydrogen at its core, the star has expanded to 27 times the Sun's radius. It is radiating about 1,200 times the Sun's luminosity from its swollen photosphere at an effective temperature of 6,533 K.

It is the brightest star in Cygnus without a Bayer designation. It was once designated i Cygni by John Flamsteed and was included in his Atlas Coelestis, but the designation is now dropped.
