= 32 Cygni =

Binary star system in the constellation Cygnus

- Location of 32 Cygni (circled)

Observation data Epoch J2000 Equinox ICRS
- Constellation: Cygnus
- Right ascension: 20^{h} 15^{m} 28.32421^{s}
- Declination: +47° 42′ 51.2139″
- Apparent magnitude (V): 3.98 (3.90 to 4.14)

Characteristics
- Spectral type: K5 Iab + B7 V
- U−B color index: +1.03
- B−V color index: +1.52
- Variable type: EA

Astrometry
Radial velocity (R_{v})	−14.4 km/s
Proper motion (μ)	RA: +0.18 mas/yr Dec.: −2.319 mas/yr
Parallax (π)	3.2558±0.189 mas
Distance	1,174±59 ly (360±18 pc)
Absolute magnitude (M_{V})	−3.56

Orbit
Period (P)	1,147.8 days
Semi-major axis (a)	5.50±1.20 mas
Eccentricity (e)	0.300
Inclination (i)	65.50±8.30°
Periastron epoch (T)	2433141.8 HJD
Argument of periastron (ω) (secondary)	218.20°

Details

32 Cyg A
Mass	8±1.2 M_{☉}
Radius	183.2+10.1 −11.35 R_{☉}
Luminosity	6,600 L_{☉}
Surface gravity (log g)	0.86 cgs
Temperature	3,974±64 K
Metallicity [Fe/H]	−0.15 dex
Age	< 20 Myr

32 Cyg B
Mass	4.13 M_{☉}
Radius	3.0 R_{☉}
Luminosity	302 L_{☉}
Temperature	16,200 K

Other designations
- ο^{2} Cyg, ο^{3} Cyg, 32 Cyg, BD+47°3059, HIP 99848, HR 7751, SAO 49385
- A: HD 192909
- B: HD 192910

Database references
SIMBAD	32 Cyg

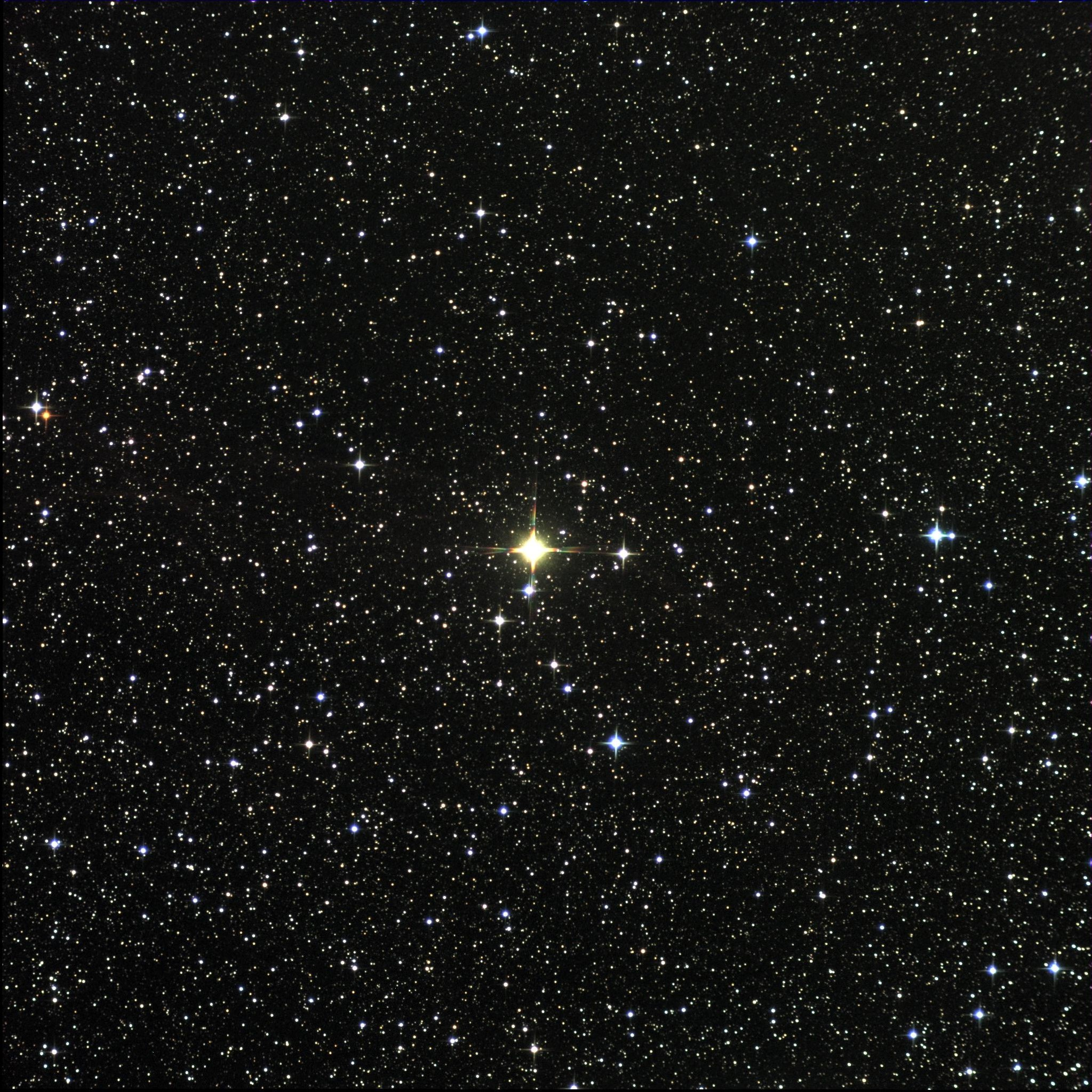
32 Cygni

32 Cygni is a binary star system in the constellation of Cygnus. It has the Bayer designation Omicron^{2} Cyg, which is Latinized from ο^{2} Cyg and abbreviated ο^{3} Cyg. This is a 4th magnitude star, which can be seen with the naked eye under suitably dark skies. Parallax measurements give an estimated distance of 1,000 light-years (307 parsecs) from the Earth. However, Schröder et al. (2007) suggest the actual value, after correcting for Malmquist bias, may be closer to 1,174 light-years (360 parsecs). Although it is a spectrsocopic binary with components that cannot be separated visually, it has two entries in the Henry Draper Catalogue, with identical magnitudes and positions, but showing the spectral types of the two components.

The Bayer letter ο (omicron) has been variously applied to two or three of the stars 30, 31, and 32 Cygni. 32 Cygni has been designated as either ο^{2} or ο^{3} Cygni. For clarity, it is preferred to use the Flamsteed designation 32 Cygni rather than one of the Bayer designations.

The primary component in this system, 32 Cygni A, has a stellar classification of K5 Iab, indicating that it is a supergiant star. Its effective temperature of 3,840 K lies in the range for K-type stars, giving it an orange hue. This star has over seven times more than the mass of the Sun and the outer envelope has expanded to about 184 times the Sun's radius. It is radiating 6,600 times the luminosity of the Sun.

32 Cygni B, the companion star, is three times as luminous as the Sun and four times as massive. It has a much higher effective temperature of 16,200 K and is radiating over 300 times the Sun's luminosity. This star has the blue-white hue of a B7 star main sequence star.

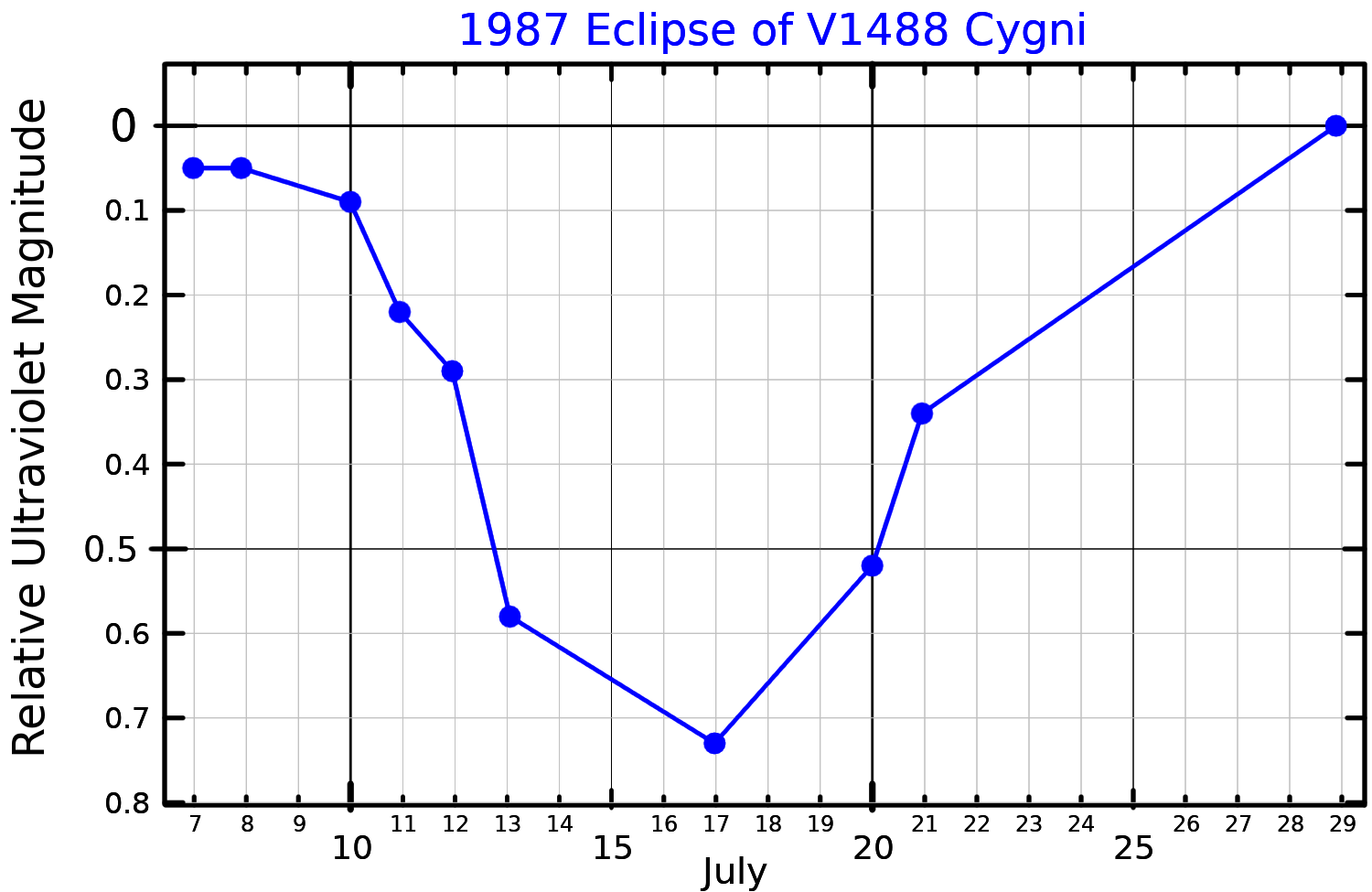
An ultraviolet band light curve for the 1987 eclipse of V1488 Cygni, plotted from data presented by Dolzan (1987)

The two stars form an eclipsing binary system (variable star designation: V1488 Cyg) similar to Algol. The orbital plane of the two stars is nearly aligned with the line of sight from the Earth, so that the supergiant star eclipses the secondary component once per orbit. During an eclipse, emission lines can be seen in the spectrum of this system. These originate in the stellar wind escaping from the supergiant star. In a volume around the B star, this wind becomes ionized, resulting in a circumstellar H II region. The supergiant star is losing mass at the rate of 1.3×10^{−8} times the mass of the Sun per year, or the equivalent of the Sun's mass every 77 million years.

The Washington Double Star Catalog and Catalog of Components of Double and Multiple Stars both list a visual companion 208" distant. This star is the 8th magnitude A class HD 192933.
