= Iota2 Cygni =

A-type main sequence star in the constellation Cygnus

Iota^{2} Cygni
- Location of ι^{2} Cygni (circled in red)

Observation data Epoch J2000 Equinox ICRS
- Constellation: Cygnus
- Right ascension: 19^{h} 29^{m} 42.36^{s}
- Declination: +51° 43′ 47.2″
- Apparent magnitude (V): 3.76

Characteristics
- Evolutionary stage: main sequence
- Spectral type: A5V
- B−V color index: +0.148±0.001

Astrometry
Radial velocity (R_{v})	−19.5±2.7 km/s
Proper motion (μ)	RA: +20.59 mas/yr Dec.: +128.33 mas/yr
Parallax (π)	26.88±0.11 mas
Distance	121.3 ± 0.5 ly (37.2 ± 0.2 pc)
Absolute magnitude (M_{V})	+0.91

Details
Mass	1.80 M_{☉}
Radius	3.83+0.40 −0.36 R_{☉}
Luminosity	34.5±0.5 L_{☉}
Surface gravity (log g)	3.91 cgs
Temperature	8,216±279 K
Rotational velocity (v sin i)	240 km/s
Age	577 Myr

Other designations
- ι^{2} Cyg, 10 Cygni, BD+51°2605, GC 26947, HD 184006, HIP 95853, HR 7420, SAO 31702

Database references
SIMBAD	data

Iota^{2} Cygni is a single star in the constellation Cygnus. Its name is a Bayer designation that is Latinized from ι^{2} Cygni, and abbreviated Iota^{2} Cyg or ι^{2} Cyg, albeit it is often just called ι Cyg. It is visible to the naked eye as a white-hued point of light with an apparent visual magnitude of 3.76. Located around 121.3 light-years distant from the Sun based on parallax, it is drifting closer with a radial velocity of −19.5 km/s and is expected to come to within 92 light-years in around 783,000 years.

This it is an A-type main-sequence star with a stellar classification of A5V, a star that is currently fusing its core hydrogen. It is around 577 million years old and is spinning rapidly with a projected rotational velocity of 240 km/s. The star has 1.8 times the mass of the Sun and 3.8 times the Sun's radius. It is radiating 35 times the luminosity of the Sun from its photosphere at an effective temperature of 8,216 K. Based on rapid changes in the strength of a singly-ionized calcium absorption line, the star is likely host to a circumstellar disk.
