= 59 Cygni =

Star in the constellation Cygnus

- Location of 59 Cygni (circled in red)

Observation data Epoch J2000 Equinox ICRS
- Constellation: Cygnus
- Right ascension: 20^{h} 59^{m} 49.55164^{s}
- Declination: +47° 31′ 15.3789″
- Apparent magnitude (V): 4.74

Characteristics
- Spectral type: B1.5Vnne + sdO + A3V + A8III + ?
- B−V color index: −0.084±0.004
- Variable type: γ Cas

Astrometry
Radial velocity (R_{v})	1.4±4.2 km/s
Proper motion (μ)	RA: +9.534 mas/yr Dec.: +3.090 mas/yr
Parallax (π)	2.5088±0.3226 mas
Distance	approx. 1,300 ly (approx. 400 pc)
Absolute magnitude (M_{V})	−3.37

Orbit
Period (P)	28.1871±0.0011 d
Eccentricity (e)	0.141±0.008
Periastron epoch (T)	45677.6±0.3 HJD
Argument of periastron (ω) (secondary)	257±4°
Semi-amplitude (K_{1}) (primary)	11.7±0.9 km/s
Semi-amplitude (K_{2}) (secondary)	121.3±1.1 km/s

Details

59 Cyg Aa1 (Be star)
Mass	6.3–9.4 M_{☉}
Radius	5.5–7.0 R_{☉}
Luminosity	7,943 L_{☉}
Surface gravity (log g)	3.78±0.09 cgs
Temperature	21,800±700 K
Rotational velocity (v sin i)	379±27 km/s

59 Cyg Aa2 (sdO)
Mass	0.62–0.91 M_{☉}
Radius	0.34–0.43 R_{☉}
Luminosity	1,000 L_{☉}
Surface gravity (log g)	5.0±1.0 cgs
Temperature	52,100±4,800 K
Rotational velocity (v sin i)	< 40 km/s

Other designations
- f^{1} Cyg, 59 Cyg, V832 Cyg, BD+46°3133, FK5 1551, HD 200120, HIP 103632, HR 8047, SAO 50335, WDS J20598+4731

Database references
SIMBAD	data

59 Cygni is a multiple star system in the northern constellation of Cygnus, located roughly 1,300 light years away from Earth. It is visible to the naked eye as a blue-white hued star with a combined apparent visual magnitude of 4.74.

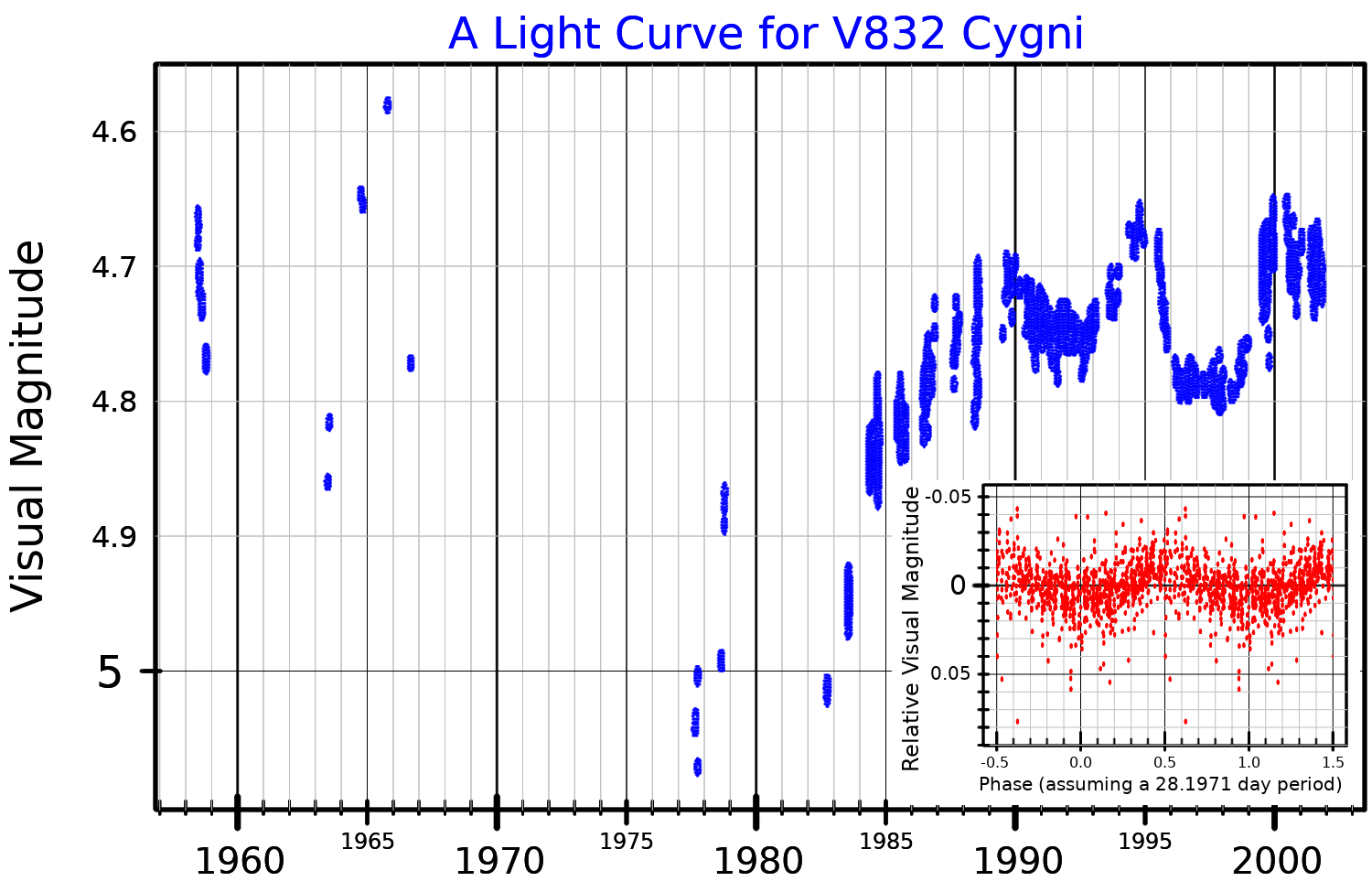
A visual band light curve of V832 Cygni. The main plot shows the long-term variability, and the inset plot shows the variation over a single orbital period. Adapted from Harmanec et al. (2002)

The primary component and brightest member of this system, designated 59 Cyg Aa, is a rapidly rotating Be star with a stellar classification of B1.5 Vnne. This is a well-studied star thanks to pronounced spectral variations that have been observed since 1916, and two short-term shell star phases that were observed in 1973 and 1974–5. It is actually a confirmed spectroscopic binary system with a high temperature subdwarf O-type companion in a 28-day orbital period. The latter is heating the nearest side of the circumstellar gaseous disk that surrounds the primary.

Orbiting the primary pair is 59 Cyg Ab, a magnitude 7.64 A-type main-sequence star of class A3V, located at an angular separation of 0.200″. A fourth component is a magnitude 9.8 A-type giant star of class A8III at a separation of 20.2″ along a position angle (PA) of 352°, as of 2008. The fifth companion is magnitude 11.7 at a separation of 26.7″ and a PA of 141°. Gaia Data Release 2 suggests that the companions at 20.2″ and 26.7″ are respectively 382 pc and 366 pc away and moving in approximately the same direction as the primary triple.
