= 63 Cygni =

K-type bright giant/supergiant star in the constellation Cygnus

- Location of 63 Cygni (circled in red)

Observation data Epoch J2000 Equinox ICRS
- Constellation: Cygnus
- Right ascension: 21^{h} 06^{m} 36.103^{s}
- Declination: +47° 38′ 54.22″
- Apparent magnitude (V): 4.56

Characteristics
- Spectral type: K4 Ib–IIa
- B−V color index: 1.569±0.012

Astrometry
Radial velocity (R_{v})	−26.32±0.23 km/s
Proper motion (μ)	RA: +5.992 mas/yr Dec.: −1.067 mas/yr
Parallax (π)	2.66±0.29 mas
Distance	approx. 1,200 ly (approx. 380 pc)
Absolute magnitude (M_{V})	−2.93

Details
Radius	138 R_{☉}
Luminosity	3,981 - 4,130 L_{☉}
Surface gravity (log g)	1.27 cgs
Temperature	3,927 K
Metallicity [Fe/H]	0.12 dex
Rotational velocity (v sin i)	6.3 km/s

Other designations
- f^{2} Cyg, 63 Cyg, BD+47°3292, FK5 3688, HD 201251, HIP 104194, HR 8089, SAO 50456, WDS J21066+4739

Database references
SIMBAD	data

63 Cygni is a single star in the northern constellation of Cygnus, located around 1,030 light years away from Sun. It is visible to the naked eye as an orange-hued star with an apparent visual magnitude of 4.56. 63 Cyg is moving closer to the Earth with a heliocentric radial velocity of −26 km/s.

This is an evolved star showing a stellar spectrum with mixed traits between a bright giant and supergiant. It has been chosen as a spectral standard for the class of K4 Ib–IIa.

For reasons that are not yet clear, 63 Cygni is displaying very long period (982 days) and low-amplitude (742 m/s) variations in radial velocity. The star has expanded to 35 times the Sun's radius and is radiating 4,397 times the Sun's luminosity from its photosphere at an effective temperature of 4,204 K.
