= KOI-256 =

Double star in the constellation Draco

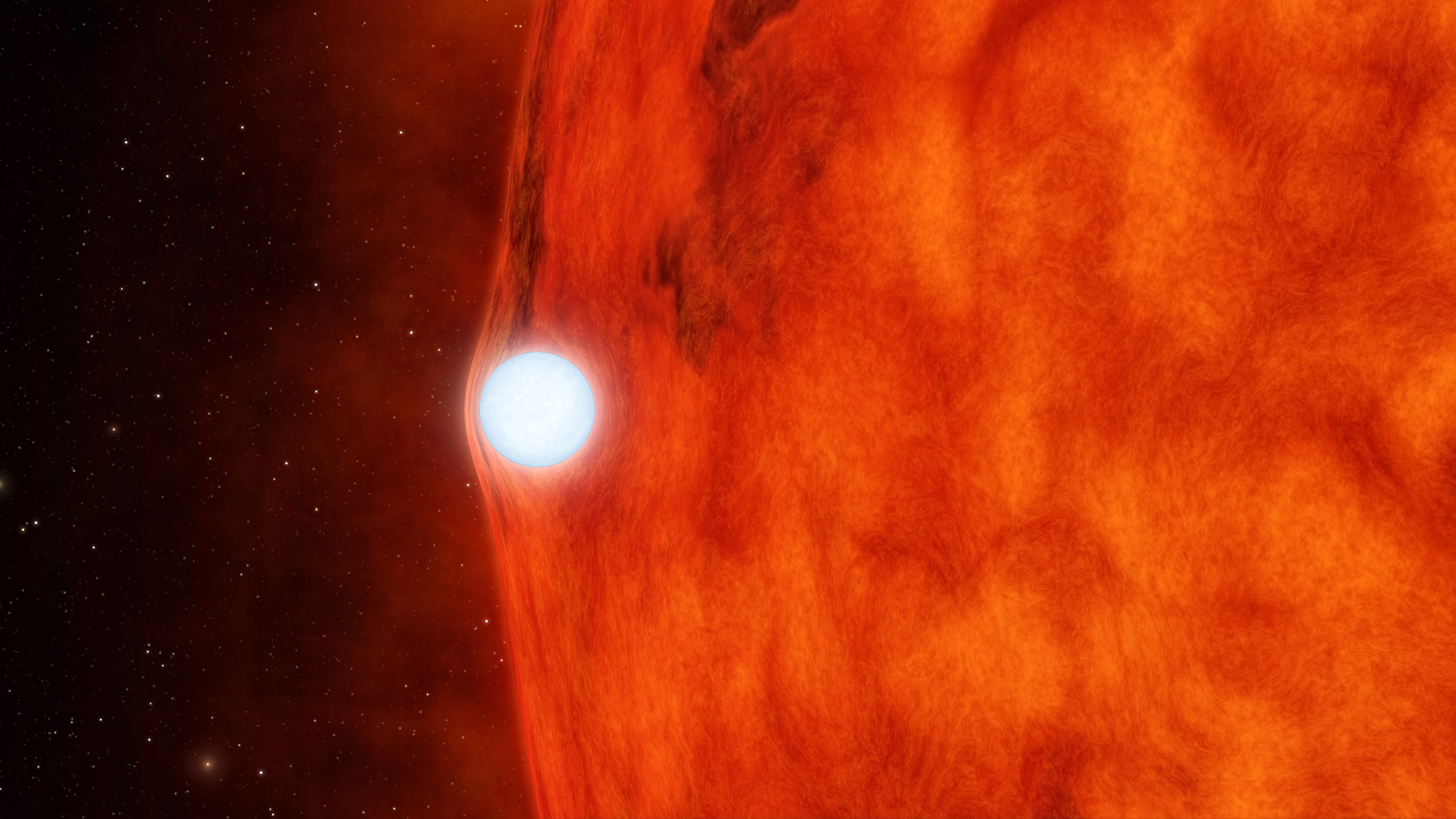
- Artist's impression of the white dwarf companion gravitationally bending the starlight of KOI-256

Observation data Epoch J2000 Equinox ICRS
- Constellation: Draco
- Right ascension: 19^{h} 00^{m} 44.42489^{s}
- Declination: +49° 33′ 55.2489″

Characteristics

KOI-256 A
- Evolutionary stage: Red dwarf
- Spectral type: M3V
- Apparent magnitude (Kepler): 15.37
- Apparent magnitude (J): 12.701±0.024
- Apparent magnitude (H): 12.001±0.019
- Apparent magnitude (Ks): 11.783±0.023
- Apparent magnitude (r): 15.754
- Apparent magnitude (i): 14.636
- Apparent magnitude (z): 14.059
- R−I color index: 1.118
- J−H color index: 0.700±0.031
- J−K color index: 0.918±0.033

KOI-256 B
- Evolutionary stage: White dwarf
- Spectral type: D
- Apparent magnitude (Kepler): 19.45

Astrometry
Proper motion (μ)	RA: −6.796±0.030 mas/yr Dec.: −14.373±0.030 mas/yr
Parallax (π)	5.6681±0.0228 mas
Distance	575 ± 2 ly (176.4 ± 0.7 pc)

Orbit
Name	KOI-256 B
Period (P)	1.3786548±0.00001 d
Semi-major axis (a)	0.0250±0.0018 AU
Eccentricity (e)	0
Inclination (i)	89.01±0.65°
Periastron epoch (T)	2455373.635498±0.000036
Argument of periastron (ω) (primary)	90°
Semi-amplitude (K_{1}) (primary)	106.5±1.8 km/s

Details

KOI-256 A
Mass	0.51±0.15 M_{☉}
Radius	0.54±0.014 R_{☉}
Temperature	3450±50 K
Metallicity	+0.31±0.10
Rotational velocity (v sin i)	19.79±0.52 km/s

KOI-256 B
Mass	0.592±0.084 M_{☉}
Radius	0.01345±0.00091 R_{☉}
Temperature	7100±800 K

Other designations
- KIC 11548140, 2MASS J19004443+4933553

Database references
SIMBAD	data
Exoplanet Archive	data
KIC	data

KOI-256 is a double star located in the constellation Draco approximately 575 light-years (176 pc) from Earth. While observations by the Kepler spacecraft suggested the system contained a gas giant exoplanet orbiting a red dwarf, later studies determined that KOI-256 was a binary system composed of the red dwarf orbiting a white dwarf.

== Name ==
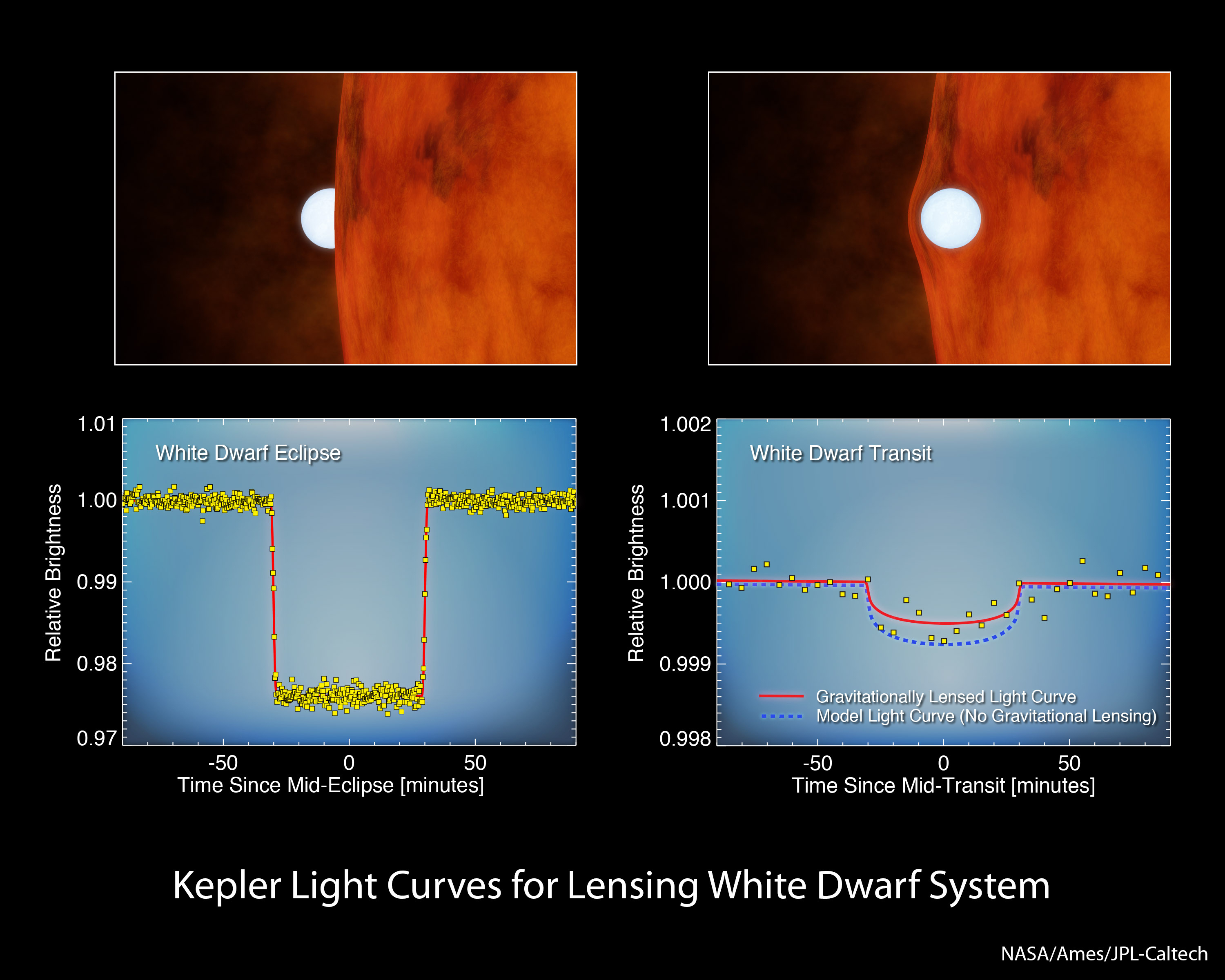
KOI-256

The acronym "KOI" comes from Kepler object of interest and means that the object has been cataloged by the Kepler spacecraft during its search for extrasolar planets using the transit method. The "256" is the number of the object.

== Characteristics ==
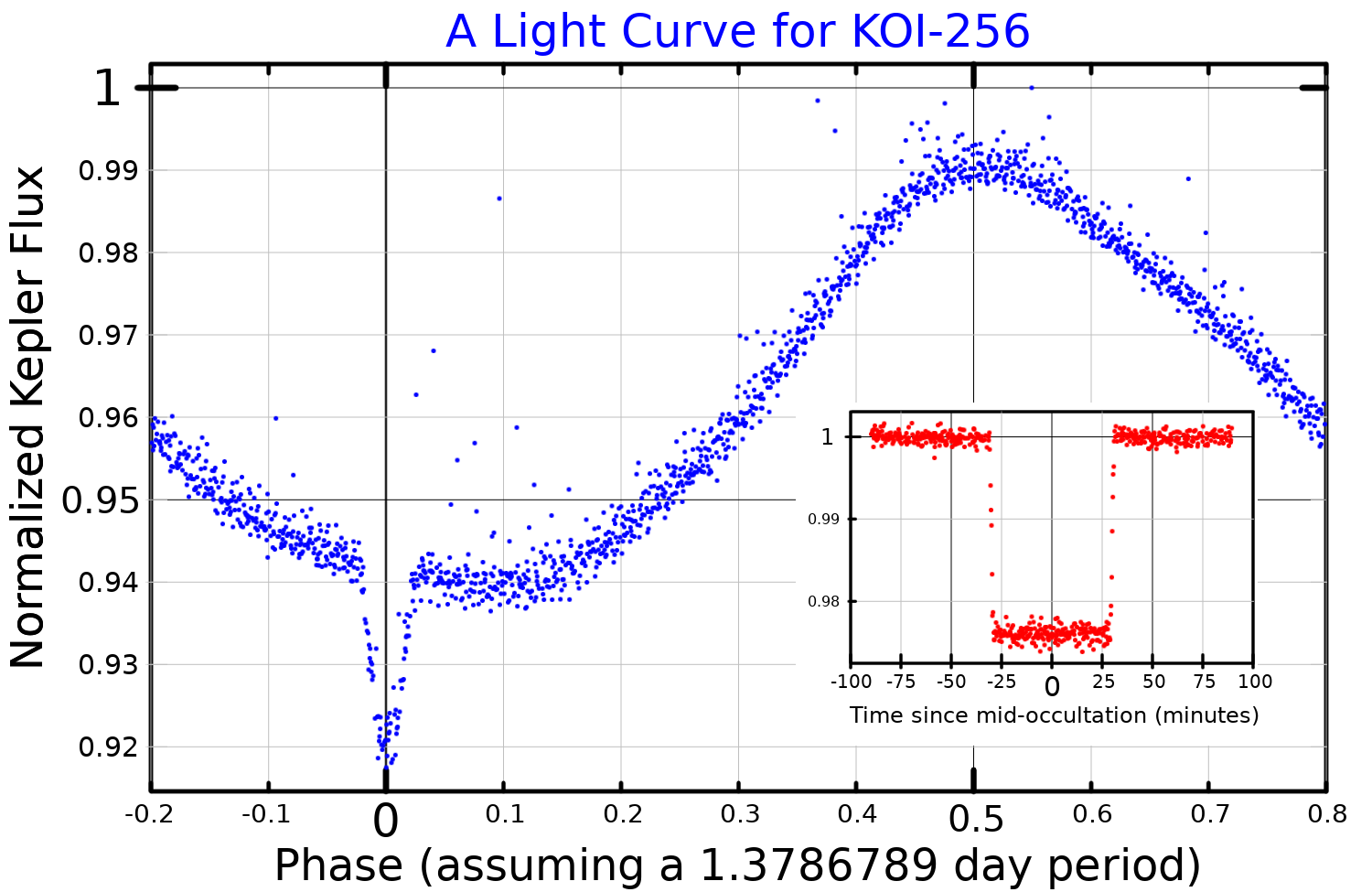
A light curve for KOI-256, plotted from Kepler data. The inset plot (adapted from Muirhead et al.) shows the time near the occultation of the white dwarf.

Initial observations by the Kepler spacecraft suggested a central red dwarf with a mass of 0.65 M_{☉}, a radius of 1.1 R_{☉}, and a temperature of 3,639 K (3,366 °C; 6,091 °F). Its candidate exoplanet was estimated to have a mass of 14.8 M_{🜨}, a radius of 25.34 R_{🜨}, an orbital period of 1.38 days, a temperature of 1,160 K (890 °C; 1,630 °F), and a semi-major axis of 0.021 astronomical units. Further studies by Muirhead et al. (2012) refined the candidate exoplanet parameters to a radius of 5.60±0.76 R_{🜨}, a temperature of 726 K (453 °C; 847 °F), and a semi-major axis of 0.016 AU.

Muirhead et al. (2013) performed additional observations with the Hale Telescope at Palomar Observatory. Using the radial velocity method for exoplanet detection, Muirhead's team found that the red dwarf was wobbling too much to be caused by a planetary mass object, and was more likely being influenced by a white dwarf. Using ultraviolet data from the GALEX spacecraft, it was seen that the red dwarf was significantly active, further suggesting perturbations by a white dwarf. The team re-analyzed Kepler's data, and found that when the white dwarf passed in front of the red dwarf, the red dwarf's light noticeably warped and brightened, an effect called gravitational lensing. While only being slightly larger than the Earth, the white dwarf has such large mass that the physically larger red dwarf orbits around its smaller companion.

With the new observations, the red dwarf was shown to have a mass of 0.51±0.15 M_{☉}, a radius of 0.540±0.014 R_{☉}, and a temperature of 3,450 ± 50 K (3,180 ± 50 °C; 5,750 ± 90 °F). The white dwarf has a mass of 0.592±0.084 M_{☉}, a radius of 0.01345±0.00091 R_{☉}, and a temperature of 7,100 ± 800 K (6,800 ± 800 °C; 12,300 ± 1,400 °F).
