= William J. Borucki =

NASA Kepler planet discovery mission principal investigator

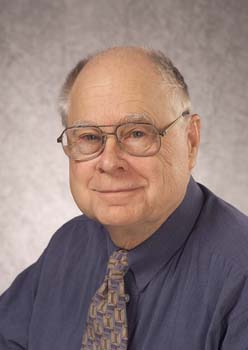
William J. Borucki (date unknown).

William J. (Bill) Borucki (born 1939) is a space scientist who worked at the NASA Ames Research Center. Upon joining NASA in 1962, Borucki joined the group conducting research on the heat shield for Apollo program spacecraft. He later turned his attention to the optical efficiency of lightning strikes in the atmospheres of planets, investigating the propensity that these lightning strikes could create molecules that would later become the precursors for life. Subsequently, Borucki's attention turned to extrasolar planets and their detection, particularly through the transit method. In light of this work, Borucki was named the principal investigator for NASA's Kepler space telescope mission, launched on March 7, 2009 and dedicated to a transit-based search for habitable planets. In 2013, Borucki was awarded the United States National Academy of Sciences's Henry Draper Medal for his work with Kepler. In 2015 he received the Shaw Prize in Astronomy.

== Education and career ==
Born in Chicago in 1939, Borucki grew up in Delavan, Wisconsin. He studied physics at the University of Wisconsin, Madison, earning a master's degree in the subject 1962. Following this, Borucki joined the Hypersonic Free Flight team conducting research on design for Apollo program heat shield, that was designed to protect the spacecraft and their occupants from being destroyed by the heat of re-entry into the atmosphere. After his work for Apollo, Borucki studied meteorology at San Jose State University, earning a master's degree in 1982. That year, Borucki began studies at NASA into the nature of lightning, using satellites equipped with instrumentation he helped design in order to discover what fraction of the energy in this lightning went into the production of prebiotic molecules. As a part of this research, Borucki conducted analysis based on observations from space probes in order to find the frequency of lightning on other planets within the Solar System.

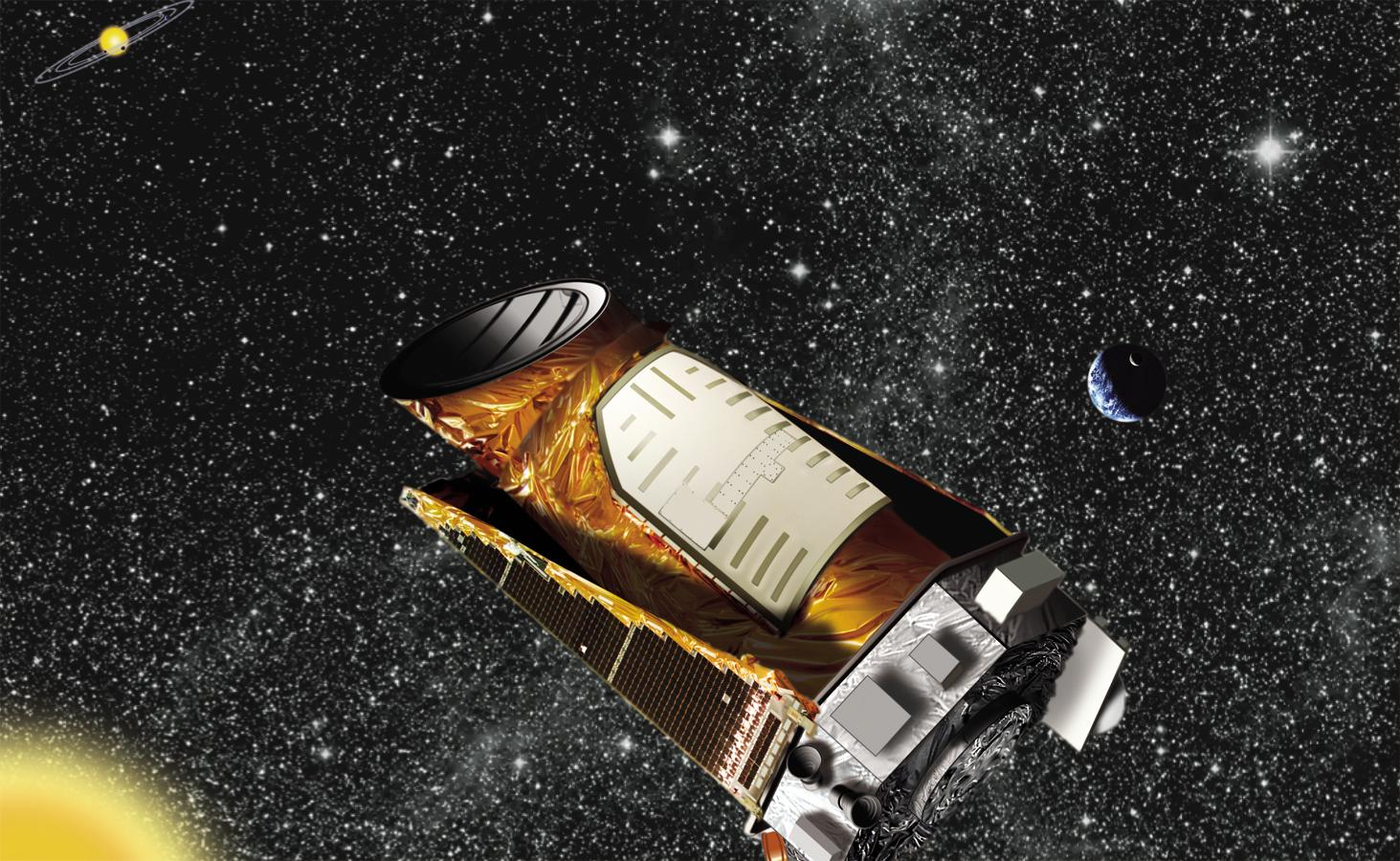
The effort to launch Kepler was spearheaded by Borucki, who is now its principal investigator.

By 1984, Borucki's attention had turned to the search for extrasolar planets by use of the transit method, which involves observing the periodic dimming of the star in order to detect the signature of a planet blocking some of its light as it passes in front. In that year and subsequently in 1988, Borucki organized workshops of scientists in order to determine the best methods for achieving transit-based detections of exoplanets, and also worked closely with the National Institute of Standards and Technology to develop photometers that could achieve the sensitivity desired. At the Lick Observatory, Borucki demonstrated the techniques required for extrasolar planet detection by the transit method, and later constructed a ground-based proof-of-concept for a space telescope designed to hunt for planets.

Until his retirement in July 2015, Borucki was the chief investigator for the Kepler space telescope, designed to hunt for exoplanets with the transit method. The telescope has detected 3253 confirmed planets and thousands of likely planet candidates as of December 6, 2022. For his work, he has received the NASA Outstanding Leadership Award, the Popular Mechanics Breakthrough Award in 2009, and the NASA Systems Engineering Excellence Award in 2010, and the Lancelot M. Berkeley Prize for Meritorious Work in Astronomy in 2011. He received the 2013 Henry Draper Medal from the United States National Academy of Sciences "For his founding concept, unflagging advocacy, and visionary leadership during the development of NASA's Kepler mission, which has uncovered myriad planets and solar systems with unforeseen and surprising properties." and the 2015 Shaw Prize in Astronomy for "his conceiving and leading the Kepler mission, which greatly advanced knowledge of both extrasolar planetary systems and stellar interiors." In 2016, he was named as a Fellow of the American Association for the Advancement of Science.

== Personal life ==
William Borucki married the former Josephine Julia Joyce in 1963. They met while both were students at the University of Wisconsin in Madison, Wisconsin. They have three daughters; Virginia (Joy), Monica, and Stella, five grandchildren; Georgia, Jack, Sydney, Kira, and Madeline, and two step grandchildren; Carina and Marcus (through Stella).

== Awards ==
- 2020 Elected a Legacy Fellow of the American Astronomical Society in 2020
- 2017 Elected member of American Academy of Arts and Sciences
- 2016 Fellow of the American Association for the Advancement of Science
- 2016 Bower Award and Prize for Achievement in Science
- 2015 Frank Drake Award for Innovation in SETI
- 2015 Shaw Prize in Astronomy, Shaw Foundation
- 2015 Trophy for Current Achievement, National Air and Space Museum
- 2015 NASA Ames Fellow
- 2014 Robert H. Goddard Memorial Trophy, National Space Club
- 2013 Space Award, The World Technology Network
- 2013 Career Achievement Award, Samuel J. Heyman Service to America Medal given by U.S. President Obama
- 2013 Exceptional Scientific Achievement Medal, NASA Honor Award
- 2013 Henry Draper Medal, National Academy of Sciences
- 2012 Nelson B. Jackson Aerospace Award, National Space Club; Kepler Team
- 2012 Vision to Reality Award, Space Frontier Foundation
- 2012 Maria and Eric Muhlmann Award, Astronomical Society of the Pacific; Kepler Team
- 2012 Space Science Award, American Institute of Aeronautics and Astronautics; Kepler Team
- 2012 George W. Goddard Space Science Award, SPIE
- 2012 John L. "Jack" Swigert, Jr., Award for Space Exploration, Space Foundation
- 2012 Laureate Award for Space, Aviation Week
- 2011 Lancelot M. Berkeley Prize for Meritorious Work in Astronomy, American Astronomical Society
- 2011 Public Service Leader of the Year, Harvard Club of San Francisco
- 2011 Professional Award, Astronomical Association of Northern California
- 2010 Outstanding Leadership Medal, NASA Honor Award
- 2010 NASA Software of the Year Award, NASA Software Advisory Panel
- 2010 Systems Engineering Excellence Award, NASA's Office of the Chief Engineer
- 2010 Group Achievement, NASA Honor Award; Kepler Team
- 2009 Breakthrough Award, Popular Mechanics
- 2005 Scientist or Researcher, Ames Honor Awards
- 2000 Group Achievement Award, NASA Honor Award; Astrobiology Team
- 1999 Superior Accomplishment, NASA Ames Award; Vulcan Project
- 1998 Group Achievement Award, Cassini Program Huygens Atmospheric Structure Instrument Team, NASA
- 1987 Excellence for Center Productivity, Quality, and Safety Award, NASA Ames
- 1967 Apollo Mission Achievement Award, NASA
