= Kepler-41 =

G-type main sequence star in the constellation Cygnus

Observation data Epoch J2000 Equinox ICRS
- Constellation: Cygnus
- Right ascension: 19^{h} 38^{m} 03.1747^{s}
- Declination: +45° 58′ 53.877″
- Apparent magnitude (V): 14.5

Characteristics
- Evolutionary stage: subgiant
- Spectral type: G2V

Astrometry
Radial velocity (R_{v})	−27.066±0.008 km/s
Proper motion (μ)	RA: 3.001(19) mas/yr Dec.: 2.965(20) mas/yr
Parallax (π)	0.9283±0.0156 mas
Distance	3,510 ± 60 ly (1,080 ± 20 pc)

Details
Mass	1.15±0.04 M_{☉}
Radius	1.36±0.07 R_{☉}
Luminosity	1.93 L_{☉}
Surface gravity (log g)	4.12 cgs
Temperature	5,630 K
Metallicity [Fe/H]	0.38±0.11 dex
Rotational velocity (v sin i)	6±2 km/s
Age	4.38+0.85 −0.93 Gyr

Other designations
- KIC 9410930, KOI-196, UCAC3 272-156898, 2MASS J19380317+4558539, Gaia DR2 2080061942886335744

Database references
SIMBAD	data
KIC	data

Kepler-41 or KOI-196 is a star in the constellation Cygnus. It is a G-type main-sequence star, like the Sun, and it is located about 3,510 light-years (1,080 parsecs) away. It is fairly similar to the Sun, with 115% of its mass, a radius of 129% times that of the Sun, and a surface temperature of 5,750 K. Search for stellar companions to Kepler-41 in 2013-2014 has yielded inconclusive results, compatible with Kepler-41 being the single star.

== Planetary system ==
In 2011, the planet Kepler-41b was discovered in orbit around the star. The planet orbits extremely close to Kepler-41, completing an orbit once every 1.86 days. Despite it receiving a high amount of radiation from Kepler-41, the radius of the Kepler-41b was initially believed to be less than that of Jupiter making it unusual for a hot Jupiter however later observations showed an inflated radius similar to other hot jupiters. Kepler-41b is also quite reflective, with a geometric albedo of 0.30.

The Kepler-41 planetary system
Companion (in order from star)	Mass	Semimajor axis (AU)	Orbital period (days)	Eccentricity	Inclination (°)	Radius
b	0.56±0.08 M_{J}	0.03101±0.0004	1.85555820±0.00000052	0 (fixed)	82.51±0.09	1.29±0.02 R_{J}
