= Kepler-41b =

Exoplanet that orbits the star Kepler 41 in the constellation Cygnus

Discovery
- Discovery date: July 29, 2011
- Detection method: Transit

Orbital characteristics
- Semi-major axis: 0.03101±0.0004 AU
- Eccentricity: 0 (fixed)
- Orbital period (sidereal): 1.85555820±0.00000052 d
- Inclination: 82.51±0.09
- Semi-amplitude: 84±11
- Star: Kepler-41

Physical characteristics
- Mean radius: 1.29±0.02 R_{J}
- Mass: 0.56±0.08 M_{J}
- Mean density: 0.33±0.04 g cm^{−3}
- Albedo: 0.2
- Temperature: 1790±31

Kepler-41b, formerly known as KOI-196b, is a planet in the orbit of star Kepler-41. It is a hot Jupiter with about the density of water. It reflects about a third of the starlight it receives. The brightest spot in the planetary atmosphere is shifted westward from the substellar point, indicating strong winds.
