= PlanetQuest =

Education and public outreach program of NASA

PlanetQuest is NASA's education and public outreach program centered on the science and technology of NASA's long-term search for habitable planets beyond the Solar System.

Major components of the PlanetQuest outreach program include:

- PlanetQuest: the Search for Another Earth, a continuously updated public news and multimedia Internet site;
- The Night Sky Network, a national coalition of amateur astronomy clubs who do astronomy education and public outreach on behalf of NASA;
- The Center for Astronomy Education, which provides professional development resources for instructors who teach introductory astronomy course, including a series of national “Teaching Excellence” workshops;
- Informal education initiatives, including “PlanetQuest Updates” provided to more than 60 museums nationwide, and interactive multimedia kiosks.

Begun in January 2002 and based at NASA's Jet Propulsion Laboratory, PlanetQuest is funded by the Exoplanet Exploration Program, a long-term suite of NASA missions designed to detect and characterize of Earth-like planets. The main components of Navigator include two ground-based and two space based missions:

On Earth:

- The Keck Interferometer. Initial interferometeric work began in 2005.
- The Large Binocular Telescope Interferometer. Instrument that is part of the Large Binocular Telescope, which has been operational since 2005.

In space:

- SIM PlanetQuest. SIM Lite cancelled in 2010.
- The Terrestrial Planet Finder observatories. De facto cancelled.
