= Discoveries of exoplanets =

Detecting planets located outside the Solar System

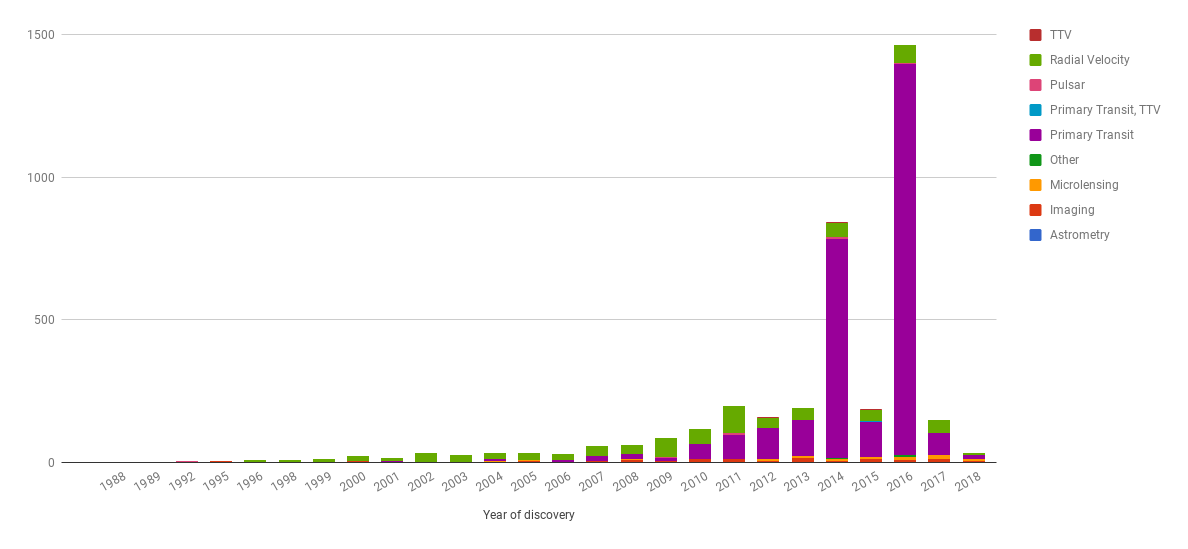
Number of extrasolar planet discoveries per year through April 2018, with colors indicating method of detection: Transit Radial velocity Microlensing / Direct imaging TTV (Timing) Pulsar timing

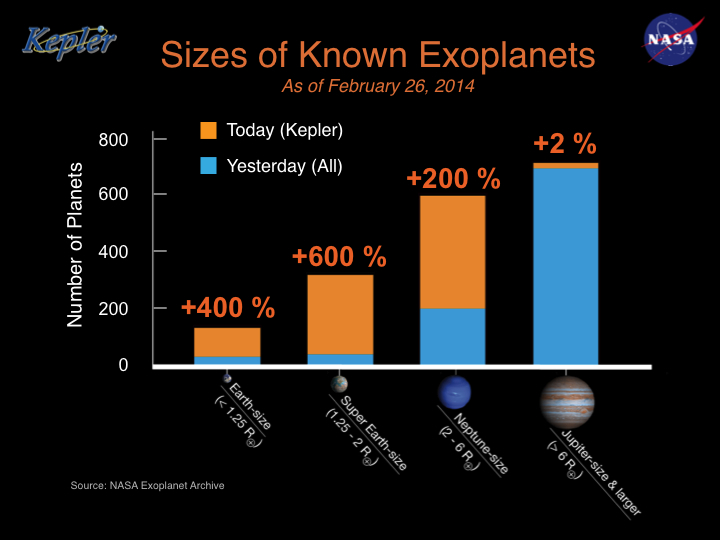
Histogram of Exoplanets by size – the gold bars represent Kepler's latest newly verified exoplanets (February 26, 2014).

Animation showing exoplanets by year from 1991 until 2022 (March) with a total of 5005 discoveries.

An exoplanet (extrasolar planet) is a planet located outside the Solar System. The first evidence of an exoplanet was noted as early as 1917, but was not recognized as such until 2016; no planet discovery has yet come from that evidence. Despite numerous purported discoveries, some with confirmations, it's now believed that the first real detection of an exoplanet was published among a list of possible candidates in 1988, though not confirmed until 2002. The first confirmed detection came in 1992, with the discovery of terrestrial-mass planets orbiting the pulsar PSR B1257+12. The first confirmation of an exoplanet orbiting a main-sequence star was made in 1995, when a giant planet was found in a four-day orbit around the nearby star 51 Pegasi. Some exoplanets have been imaged directly by telescopes, but the vast majority have been detected through indirect methods, such as the transit method and the radial-velocity method. As of 8 October 2026, there are 6,534 confirmed exoplanets in 4,908 planetary systems, with 1,080 systems having more than one planet. This is a list of the most notable discoveries.

== 1988–1994 ==
- Tadmor: The radial velocity variations of the star Errai were announced in 1989, consistent with a planet in a 2.5-year orbit. However, misclassification of the star as a giant combined with an underestimation of the orbit of the Gamma Cephei binary, which implied the planet's orbit would be unstable, led some astronomers to suspect the variations were merely due to stellar rotation. The existence of the planet was finally confirmed in 2002.
- HD 114762 b: This object has a minimum mass of 11 times the mass of Jupiter and has an 89-day orbit. At the time of its discovery it was regarded as a probable brown dwarf, although subsequently it has been included in catalogues of extrasolar planets. It was found to be indeed a brown dwarf or red dwarf star (and not an exoplanet) in 2019.
- Lich: The first confirmed discovery of extrasolar planets was made in 1992 when a system of terrestrial-mass planets was announced to be present around the millisecond pulsar PSR B1257+12.

== 1995–1998 ==
- Dimidium: In 1995 this became the first exoplanet orbiting a main-sequence star to have its existence confirmed. It is a hot Jupiter with a 4.2-day orbit.
- Taphao Thong: In 1996 this Jupiter-like planet was the first long-period planet discovered, orbiting at 2.11 AU from the star with the eccentricity of 0.049. There is a second companion that orbits at 3.39 AU with the eccentricity of 0.220 ± 0.028 and a period of 2190 ± 460 days.
- Rho Coronae Borealis b: In 1997 an exoplanet was discovered in a 39.8 day orbit with a minimum mass about the same as Jupiter. It was suggested this observation may be caused by a stellar companion in a face-on orbit, rather than a planetary companion, but subsequent analysis confirms the planetary interpretation.
- Gliese 876 b: In 1998, the first planet was found that orbits around a red dwarf star (Gliese 876). It is closer to its star than Mercury is to the Sun. More planets have subsequently been discovered even closer to the star.

== 1999 ==
- Titawin: The first multiple-planetary system to be discovered around a main sequence star. It contains three planets, all of which are Jupiter-like. Planets Saffar, Samh, Majriti were announced in 1996, 1999, and 1999 respectively. Their masses are 0.687, 1.97, and 3.93 M_{J}; they orbit at 0.0595, 0.830, and 2.54 AU respectively. In 2007 their inclinations were determined as non-coplanar.
- HD 209458 b: After being originally discovered with the radial-velocity method, this became the first exoplanet to be seen transiting its parent star. The transit detection conclusively confirmed the existence of the planets suspected to be responsible for the radial velocity measurements.

== 2001 ==
- HD 209458 b: Astronomers using the Hubble Space Telescope announced that they had detected the atmosphere of HD 209458 b. They found the spectroscopic signature of sodium in the atmosphere, but at a smaller intensity than expected, suggesting that high clouds obscure the lower atmospheric layers. In 2008 the albedo of its cloud layer was measured, and its structure modeled as stratospheric.
- Hypatia: The first planet discovered around the giant star Edasich, an orange giant. This provides evidence for the survival and behavior of planetary systems around giant stars. Giant stars have pulsations that can mimic the presence of planets. The planet is very massive and has a very eccentric orbit. It orbits on average 27.5% further from its star than Earth does from the Sun. In 2008 the system's origin would be traced to the Hyades cluster, alongside Epsilon Tauri.

== 2003 ==
- PSR B1620-26 b: On July 10, using information obtained from the Hubble Space Telescope, a team of scientists led by Steinn Sigurðsson confirmed the oldest extrasolar planet yet. The planet is located in the globular star cluster M4, about 5,600 light years from Earth in the constellation Scorpius. This is one of only a few planets known to orbit around a stellar binary; one of the stars in the binary is a pulsar and the other is a white dwarf. The planet has a mass twice that of Jupiter, and is estimated to be 12.7 billion years old.

== 2004 ==
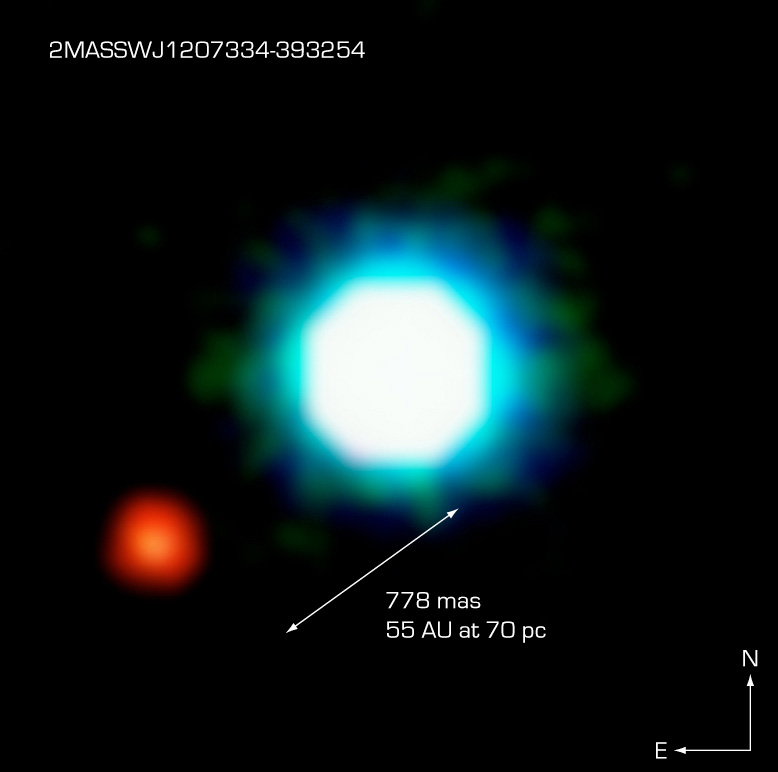
Infrared image of 2M1207 (bluish) and 2M1207b (reddish). The two objects are separated by less than one arc second in Earth's sky. Image taken using the European Southern Observatory's 8.2 m Yepun Very Large Telescope

- Mu Arae c: In August, a planet orbiting Mu Arae with a mass of approximately 14 times that of the Earth was discovered with the European Southern Observatory's HARPS spectrograph. Depending on its composition, it is the first published "hot Neptune" or "super-Earth".
- 2M1207 b: The first planet found around a brown dwarf. The planet was also the first to be directly imaged (in infrared). According to an early estimate, it has a mass 5 times that of Jupiter; other estimates give slightly lower masses. It was originally estimated to orbit at 55 AU from the brown dwarf. The brown dwarf is only 25 times as massive as Jupiter. The temperature of the gas giant planet is very high (1250 K), mostly due to gravitational contraction. In late 2005, the parameters were revised to an orbital radius of 41 AU and a mass of 3.3 Jupiters, because it was found that the system was closer to Earth than was originally believed. In 2006, a dust disk was found around 2M1207, providing evidence for active planet formation.

== 2005 ==
- TrES-1 and HD 209458b: On March 22, two groups announced the first direct detection of light emitted by exoplanets, achieved with the Spitzer Space Telescope. These studies permitted the direct study of the temperature and structure of the planetary atmospheres.
- Gliese 876 d: On June 13, a third planet orbiting the red dwarf star Gliese 876 was announced. With a mass estimated at 7.5 times that of Earth, it may be rocky in composition. The planet orbits at 0.021 AU with a period of 1.94 days.
- HD 149026 b: This planet was announced on July 1. Its unusually high density indicated that it was a giant planet with a large core, the largest one yet known. The mass of the core was estimated at 70 Earth masses (as of 2008, 80–110), accounting for at least two-thirds of the planet's total mass.

== 2006 ==
- OGLE-2005-BLG-390Lb: This planet, announced on January 25, was detected using the gravitational microlensing method. It orbits a red dwarf star around 21,500 light years from Earth, toward the center of the Milky Way galaxy. As of April 2010, it remains the most distant known exoplanet. Its mass is estimated to be 5.5 times that of Earth's. Prior to this discovery, the few known exoplanets with comparably low masses had only been discovered in orbits very close to their parent stars, but this planet is estimated to have a relatively wide separation of 2.6 AU from its parent star. Due to that wide separation and due to the inherent dimness of the star, the planet is probably the coldest exoplanet known.
- HD 69830: Has a planetary system with three Neptune-mass planets. It is the first triple planetary system without any Jupiter-like planets discovered around a Sun-like star. All three planets were announced on May 18 by Lovis. All three orbit within 1 AU. The planets b, c and d have masses of 10, 12 and 18 times that of Earth, respectively. The outermost planet, d, appears to be in the habitable zone, shepherding a thick asteroid belt.

== 2007 ==
- HD 209458 b and HD 189733 b: These became the first extrasolar planets to have their atmospheric spectra directly observed. The announcement was made on February 21, by two groups of researchers who had worked independently. One group, led by Jeremy Richardson of NASA's Goddard Space Flight Center, observed the atmosphere of HD 209458 b over a wavelength range from 7.5 to 13.2 micrometres. The results were surprising in several ways. The 10-micrometre spectral peak of water vapor was absent. An unpredicted peak was observed at 9.65 micrometres, which the investigators attributed to clouds of silicate dust. Another peak, at 7.78 micrometres, remained unexplained. The other group, led by Carl Grillmair of NASA's Spitzer Science Center, observed HD 189733 b. They also failed to detect the spectroscopic signature of water vapor. Later in the year, yet another group of researchers using a somewhat different technique succeeded in detecting water vapor in the planet's atmosphere, the first time such a detection had been made.
- Gliese 581 c: A team of astronomers led by Stephane Udry used the HARPS instrument on the European Southern Observatory's 3.6-meter telescope to discover this exoplanet by means of the radial velocity method. The team calculated that the planet could support liquid water and possibly life. However, subsequent habitability studies indicate that the planet likely suffers from a runaway greenhouse effect similar to Venus, rendering the presence of liquid water impossible. These studies suggest that the third planet in the system, Gliese 581 d, is more likely to be habitable. Seth Shostak, a senior astronomer with the SETI institute, stated that two unsuccessful searches had already been made for radio signals from extraterrestrial intelligence in the Gliese 581 system.
- Gliese 436 b: This planet was one of the first Neptune-mass planets discovered, in August 2004. In May 2007, a transit was found, revealed as the smallest and least massive transiting planet yet at 22 times that of Earth. Its density is consistent with a large core of an exotic form of solid water called "hot ice", which would exist, despite the planet's high temperatures, because the planet's gravity causes water to be extremely dense.
- TrES-4: The largest-diameter and lowest-density exoplanet to date, TrES-4 is 1.7 times Jupiter's diameter but only 0.84 times its mass, giving it a density of just 0.2 grams per cubic centimeter—about the same as balsa wood. It orbits its primary closely and is therefore quite hot, but stellar heating alone does not appear to explain its large size.

== 2008 ==
- OGLE-2006-BLG-109Lb and OGLE-2006-BLG-109Lc: On February 14, the discovery of a planetary system was announced that is the most similar one known to the Jupiter-Saturn pair within the Solar System in terms of mass ratio and orbital parameters. The presence of planets with such parameters has implications for possible life in a solar system as Jupiter and Saturn have a stabilizing effect to the habitable zone by sweeping away large asteroids from the habitable zone.
- HD 189733 b: On March 20, follow-up studies to the first spectral analyses of an extrasolar planet were published in the scientific journal Nature, announcing evidence of an organic molecule found on an extrasolar planet for the first time. The analysis showed not only water vapor, but also methane existing in the atmosphere of the giant gas planet. Although conditions on there are too harsh to harbor life, it still is the first time a key molecule for organic life was found on an extrasolar planet.
- HD 40307: On June 16, Michel Mayor announced a planetary system with three super-Earths orbiting this K-type star. The planets have masses ranging from 4 to 9 Earth masses and periods ranging from 4 to 20 days. It was suggested this might be the first multi-planet system without any known gas giants. However, a subsequent study of the system's orbital stability found that tidal interactions have had little effect on evolution of the planets' orbits. That, in turn, suggests that the planets experience relatively low tidal dissipation and hence are of primarily gaseous composition. All three were discovered by the HARPS spectrograph in La Silla, Chile.
- 1RXS J160929.1−210524: In September, an object was imaged in the infrared at a separation of 330AU from this star. Later, in June 2010, the object was confirmed to be a companion planet to the star rather than a background object aligned by chance.
- Fomalhaut b: On November 13, NASA and the Lawrence Livermore National Laboratory announced the discovery of an extrasolar planet orbiting just inside the debris ring of the A-class star Fomalhaut (Alpha Piscis Austrini). This was the first extrasolar planet to be directly imaged by an optical telescope. Its mass is estimated to be three times that of Jupiter. Based on the planet's unexpected brightness at visible wavelengths, the discovery team suspects it is surrounded by its own large disk or ring that may be a satellite system in the process of formation.
- HR 8799: Also on November 13, the discovery of three planets orbiting HR 8799 was announced. This was the first direct image of multiple planets. Christian Marois of the National Research Council of Canada's Herzberg Institute of Astrophysics and his team used the Keck and Gemini telescopes in Hawaii. The Gemini images allowed the international team to make the initial discovery of two of the planets with data obtained on October 17, 2007. Then, in July through September 2008, the team confirmed this discovery and found a third planet orbiting even closer to the star with images obtained at the Keck II telescope. A review of older data taken in 2004 with the Keck II telescope revealed that the outer 2 planets were visible on these images. Their masses and separations are approximately 7 M_{J} at 24 AU, 7 M_{J} at 38 AU, and 5 M_{J} at 68 AU.

== 2009 ==
- COROT-7b: On February 3, the European Space Agency announced the discovery of a planet orbiting the star COROT-7. Although the planet orbits its star at a distance of less than 0.02 AU, its diameter is estimated to be around 1.7 times that of Earth, making it the smallest super-Earth yet measured. Due to its extreme closeness to its parent star, it is believed to have a molten surface at a temperature of 1000–1500 °C. It was discovered by the French COROT satellite.
- Gliese 581 e: On April 21, the European Southern Observatory announced the discovery of a fourth planet orbiting the star Gliese 581. The planet orbits its parent star at a distance of less than 0.03 AU and has a minimum mass estimated at 1.9 times that of Earth. As of January 2010, this is the lightest known extrasolar planet to orbit a main-sequence star.
- 30 planets: On October 19, it was announced that 30 new planets were discovered, all were detected by the radial velocity method. It is the most planets ever announced in a single day during the exoplanet era. October 2009 now holds the most planets discovered in a month, breaking the record set in June 2002 and August 2009, during which 17 planets were discovered.
- 61 Virginis and HD 1461: On December 14, three planets (one is super-Earth and two are Neptune-mass planets) were discovered. Also, a super-Earth planet and two unconfirmed planets around HD 1461 were discovered. These discoveries indicate that low-mass planets that orbit around nearby stars are very common. 61 Virginis is the first star like the Sun to host the super-Earth planets.
- GJ 1214 b: On December 16, a super-Earth planet was discovered by transit. The determination of density from mass and radius suggest that this planet may be an ocean planet composed of 75% water and 25% rock. Some of the water on this planet should be in the exotic form of ice VII. This is the first planet discovered by MEarth Project, which is used to look for transits of super-Earth planets crossing the face of M-type stars.

== 2010 ==
- 47 Ursae Majoris d: On March 6, a gas giant like Jupiter with the longest known orbital period for any exoplanet was detected via radial velocity. It orbits its parent star at a distance similar to Saturn in the Solar System with its orbital period lasting about 38 Earth years.
- COROT-9b: On March 17, the first known temperate transiting planet was announced. Discovered by the COROT satellite, it has an orbital period of 95 days and a periastron distance of 0.36 AU, by far the largest of any exoplanet whose transit has been observed. The temperature of the planet is estimated at between 250 K and 430 K (between −20 °C and 160 °C).
- Beta Pictoris b: On June 10, for the first time astronomers have been able to directly follow the motion of an exoplanet as it moves to the other side of its host star. The planet has the smallest orbit so far of all directly imaged exoplanets, lying as close to its host star as Saturn is to the Sun.
- HD 209458 b: On June 23, astronomers announced they have measured a superstorm for the first time in the atmosphere of HD 209458 b. The very high-precision observations done by ESO’s Very Large Telescope and its powerful CRIRES spectrograph of carbon monoxide gas show that it is streaming at enormous speed from the extremely hot day side to the cooler night side of the planet. The observations also allow another exciting “first” — measuring the orbital speed of the exoplanet itself, providing a direct determination of its mass.
- HD 10180: On August 24, astronomers using ESO's HARPS instrument announced the discovery of a planetary system with up to seven planets orbiting a Sun-like star with five confirmed Neptune-mass planets and evidence of two other planets, one of which could have the lowest mass of any planet found to date orbiting a main-sequence star, and the other of which may be a long-period Saturnian planet. Additionally, there is evidence that the distances of the planets from their star follow a regular pattern, as seen in the Solar System.

== 2011 ==
- Kepler 10b: On January 10, it was discovered after several months of data collection and was the first confirmed terrestrial planet to have been discovered outside the Solar System by the Kepler Space Telescope. It lies extremely close to its star, Kepler-10, and as a result is too hot to support life. Its existence was confirmed using measurements from the W.M. Keck Observatory in Hawaii.
- Kepler 11: On February 3, astronomers using NASA's Kepler Mission announced the discovery of 6 transiting planets orbiting the star Kepler 11. Masses were confirmed using a new method called Transit Timing Variations. The architecture of the system is unique with 6 low mass, low-density planets all packed in tight orbits around their host star. The 5 inner planets all orbit inside that of Mercury in the Solar System. It is believed that these planets formed out past the snow line and migrated into their current position.
- 55 Cancri e: On April 27, 2011, the super-earth 55 Cancri e was found to transit its host star using the MOST satellite. This planet has the shortest known orbital period of any extrasolar planet at .73 days. It is also the first time a super-earth has been detected transiting a naked eye star (less than 6th magnitude in V band). The high density calculated suggests that the planet has a "rock-iron composition supplemented by a significant mass of water, gas, or other light elements".

== 2012 ==
- Alpha Centauri Bb: On 16 October 2012, the discovery was announced of an Earth-mass planet in orbit around Alpha Centauri B. The discovery of a planet in the closest star system to Earth received widespread media attention and was seen as an important landmark in exoplanet research. However, the planet was later shown not to exist.

== 2013 ==
- PH2 b: On 3 January 2013, the discovery of a "Jupiter-size" extrasolar planet that could "potentially be habitable" was announced. The exoplanet was discovered by amateur astronomers from the Planet Hunters project of amateur astronomers using data from the Kepler Mission space observatory and confirmed, with 99.9 percent confidence, by observations at the W. M. Keck Observatory in Hawaii. PH2 b is the second confirmed planet discovered by PlanetHunters.org (the first being PH1).
- Kepler-69c (formerly KOI-172.02): On 7 January 2013, the discovery of an unconfirmed (Kepler Object of Interest) candidate exoplanet was announced by astronomers affiliated with the Kepler Mission space observatory. The candidate object, a Super-Earth, has a radius 1.54 times that of Earth. Kepler-69c orbits a sun-like star, named Kepler-69, within the "habitable zone" a zone where liquid water could exist on the surface of the planet. Scientists claim the exoplanet, if confirmed, could be a "prime candidate to host alien life".
- On 18 April 2013, NASA announced the discovery of three new Earth-like exoplanets – Kepler-62e, Kepler-62f, and Kepler-69c (now confirmed) – in the habitable zones of their respective host stars, Kepler-62 and Kepler-69. The new exoplanets, which are considered prime candidates for possessing liquid water and thus potentially life, were identified using the Kepler space observatory.
- WASP-76b, an exotic planet was discovered that has a 100% chance of having hot liquid iron; its dayside temperatures reach 2,400 °C (4,350 °F), on the other hand, its nightside is 1,000 °C (1,800 °F) cooler, allowing its metals to condense and rain out.

== 2014 ==
- On 26 February 2014, NASA announced the discovery of 715 newly verified exoplanets around 305 stars by the Kepler Space Telescope. The exoplanets were found using a statistical technique called "verification by multiplicity". 95% of the discovered exoplanets were smaller than Neptune and four, including Kepler-296f, were less than 2 1/2 the size of Earth and were in habitable zones where surface temperatures are suitable for liquid water.
- In November 2014, the Planet Hunters group discovered the exoplanet PH3 c. This exoplanet is 700 parsecs away from Earth, is a low density planet and is four times as massive as Earth.
- In July 2014, NASA announced the determination of the most precise measurement so far attained for the size of an exoplanet (Kepler-93b); the discovery of an exoplanet (Kepler-421b) that has the longest known year (704 days) of any transiting planet found so far; and, finding very dry atmospheres on three exoplanets (HD 189733b, HD 209458b, WASP-12b) orbiting sun-like stars.

== 2015 ==
- On 6 January 2015, NASA announced the 1000th confirmed exoplanet discovered by the Kepler Space Telescope. Three of the newly confirmed exoplanets were found to orbit within habitable zones of their host stars: two of the three, Kepler-438b and Kepler-442b, are near-Earth-size and likely rocky; the third, Kepler-440b, is a super-Earth. Similar confirmed small exoplanets in habitable zones found earlier by Kepler include: Kepler-62e, Kepler-62f, Kepler-186f, Kepler-296e and Kepler-296f.
- On 23 July 2015, NASA announced the release of the Seventh Kepler Candidate Catalog, bringing the total number of confirmed exoplanets to 1030 and the number of exoplanet candidates to 4,696. This announcement also included the first report of Kepler-452b, a near-Earth-size planet orbiting the habitable zone of a G2-type star, as well as eleven other "small habitable zone candidate planets".
- On 30 July 2015, NASA confirmed the discovery of the nearest rocky planet outside the Solar System, larger than Earth, 21 light-years away. HD 219134 b is the closest exoplanet to Earth to be detected transiting in front of its star. The planet has a mass 4.5 times that of Earth, a radius about 1.6 times that of Earth, with a three-day orbit around its star. Combining the size and mass gives it a density of 6 g/cm^{3}, confirming that it is a rocky planet.
- In September 2015, astronomers reported the unusual light fluctuations of KIC 8462852, an F-type main-sequence star in the constellation Cygnus, as detected by the Kepler space telescope, while searching for exoplanets. Various explanations have been presented, including those based on comets, asteroids, as well as, an alien civilization.

== 2016 ==
- On August 24, 2016, the Pale Red Dot campaign announced the discovery of Proxima b. Orbiting the closest star to the Solar System, Proxima Centauri, the 1.3 Earth-mass exoplanet orbits within the star's habitable zone. The planet was discovered by the HARPS and UVES instruments on telescopes at the European Southern Observatory in Chile, after signs of a planet orbiting Proxima Centauri were first found in 2013.

== 2017 ==
- On 22 February 2017, several scientists working at the California Institute of Technology for NASA, using the Spitzer Space Telescope, announced the discovery of seven potentially habitable exoplanets orbiting TRAPPIST-1, a star about 40 light-years away. Three of these planets are said to be located within the habitable zone of the TRAPPIST-1 solar system and have the potential to harbor liquid water on their surface and possibly sustain life. The discovery sets a new record for the greatest number of habitable-zone planets found around a single star outside the Solar System. TRAPPIST-1 is a red dwarf, which raises the likelihood of the exoplanets orbiting TRAPPIST-1 being tidally locked with the parent star.
- Ross 128 b is a confirmed Earth-sized exoplanet, likely rocky, orbiting within the inner habitable zone of the red dwarf Ross 128. It is the second-closest potentially habitable exoplanet found, at a distance of about 11 light-years; only Proxima Centauri b is closer. The planet is only 35% more massive than Earth, receives only 38% more sunlight, and is expected to be a temperature suitable for liquid water to exist on the surface, if it has an atmosphere.

== 2018 ==
- Analyses show that K2-155d may fall into the habitable zone and support liquid water.
- WASP-104b, a Hot Jupiter exoplanet, has been considered by researchers to be one of the darkest exoplanets ever discovered.
- Helium has been detected for the first time in the atmosphere of an exoplanet by scientists observing WASP-107b.
- On 7 June, scientists working at the Physical Research Laboratory (PRL) for ISRO, using the PRL Advance Radial-velocity Abu-Sky Search (Paras) spectrograph integrated with a telescope at the Mount Abu InfraRed Observatory, announced the discovery of host star EPIC 211945201 or K2-236 and exoplanet EPIC 211945201b or K2-236b. Located at a distance of 600 light-years from Earth, the exoplanet has a mass 27 times heavier than that of Earth and is 6 times its radius. K2-236b has a surface temperature of 600 °C.

== 2019 ==
- GJ 357 d, a planet which is considered to be a "Super-Earth" within the circumstellar habitable zone of its parent star.
- LTT 1445Ab, a rocky planet which takes only five days to go around its star, its surface temperature reaches 320 °F (160 °C).
- DS Tucanae Ab, a Neptune-like exoplanet that orbits a G-type star, it takes 8.1 days to complete one orbit of its star.

== 2020 ==
- LHS 1815b, a thick-disk planet outside the Galactic plane, discovered by TESS.
- Kepler-1649c, an Earth-size exoplanet in the habitable zone.
- TOI-700 d, in January 2020, scientists announced the discovery of TOI 700 d, the first Earth-sized planet in the habitable zone detected by TESS.
- KOI-456.04, a planet in the habitable zone of Kepler-160.
- GJ 3470 c, the first exoplanet candidate fully discovered by amateur astronomers.
- WASP-189b, an ultra-Hot Jupiter observed by CHEOPS in September 2020.
- OGLE-2016-BLG-1928, found by brief gravitational lensing. An Earth-mass strong candidate rogue planet being more than 8 AU from any star in the Milky Way.

== 2021 ==
- HD 110082 b, a sub-Neptune exoplanet that orbits the star HD 110082.
- Scientists announce the discovery of isotopes on TYC 8998-760-1 b, an exoplanet located 300 light-years away in the constellation Musca. The discovery was made via ESO's Very Large Telescope in Chile.

== 2022 ==
- On March 21, 2022, NASA announces that they have discovered their 5000th exoplanet since 1992.
- On August 3, 2022, Ross 508b, a Super-Earth exoplanet, is discovered. The exoplanet is 37 light years away from Earth.
- On August 9, 2022, a newborn Jupiter-sized exoplanet in AS 209 system is discovered via the Atacama Large Millimeter Array telescope in Chile.

== 2023 ==
- On January 11, 2023, the James Webb Space Telescope reported the discovery of its first exoplanet LHS 475 b
- On April 3, 2023, a study published by the Nature Astronomy discovers bursts of radiation in radio wavelengths from YZ Ceti, which may be associated with interaction of the innermost planet, YZ Ceti b.
- A study published by Nature on May 17, 2023, indicates the discovery of exoplanet LP 791-18 d, a planet likely tidally heated by the nearby mini-Neptune LP 791-18 c potentially producing volcanoes on its surface.
- The James Webb Space Telescope discovers a trace of water on WASP-18b with a mass of 10 Jupiters. The statement was announced by NASA on May 31, 2023.
- On June 12, 2023, scientists discovered BEBOP-1c orbiting the binary star system TOI-1338. The findings were detailed in the Nature Astronomy journal.

== 2024 ==
- In a study published by the Nature journal, astronomers announce the discovery of IRAS 04125+2902 b, a newborn exoplanet. The discovery was made by Madyson Barber, a graduate student at the University of North Carolina at Chapel Hill.
- In May 2024 scientists discovered Gliese 12 b an Earth size exoplanet.
- 82 G. Eridani d, an exoplanet orbiting within the habitat zone of its star.
- 20 Leonis Minoris b is a hot Neptune-type planet.
- On October 1, 2024, Barnard's Star b was discovered 6 light years from Earth.

== 2025 ==
- In 2025 BD+05 4868 Ab was discovered using the Transiting Exoplanet Survey Satellite. The exoplanet was in the process of disintegrating as a result of being too close to its star.
- Barnard's star-c, Barnard's star-d, and Barnard's star-e were discovered via radial velocity method.
- Gliese 251 c, a potentially habitable planet, was discovered using radial velocity

== 2026 ==
- A molten ocean is discovered on the exoplanet L 98-59 d, a dwarf star of L 98-59 that orbits a red dwarf star 34-light years away from Earth.
