= Kepler-395c =

Potential goldilocks Super-Earth orbiting Kepler-395

Discovery
- Discovered by: Jason F. Rowe et al.
- Discovery site: Kepler
- Discovery date: February 26, 2014
- Detection method: Transit method

Orbital characteristics
- Orbital period (sidereal): 34.989262 d
- Time of periastron: JD 2454977.22265
- Star: Kepler-395

Physical characteristics
- Mean radius: 1.32 R_{🜨}
- Mean density: 2.7856 g/cm^{3} (0.10064 lb/cu in)

Kepler-395c is a potentially habitable exoplanet 616 light-years away in the constellation of Cygnus.

== Habitability and Properties ==
It orbits an M-type star. Its radius is 1.32 ± 0.09 times that of Earth. It orbits at 0.177 AU with an orbital period of 34.9893 days. Because of its proximity to its star, it is likely to be tidally locked, meaning one side always facing the star, and one side always facing away. This means one side is blistering hot, and one side is bitter cold. However, in between those hostile zones, there would be a sliver of habitability. If it has a thick enough atmosphere, the sliver may even be global.

Size comparison
Earth	Kepler-395c
	Exoplanet

== See also ==
- Kepler-186e
- Kepler-186f
- Kepler-438b
- Kepler-442b
- Kepler-296e
- Kepler-62e
- Kepler-69c
- Kepler-395b
