= Elisa Quintana =

American astronomer

Elisa Victoria Quintana
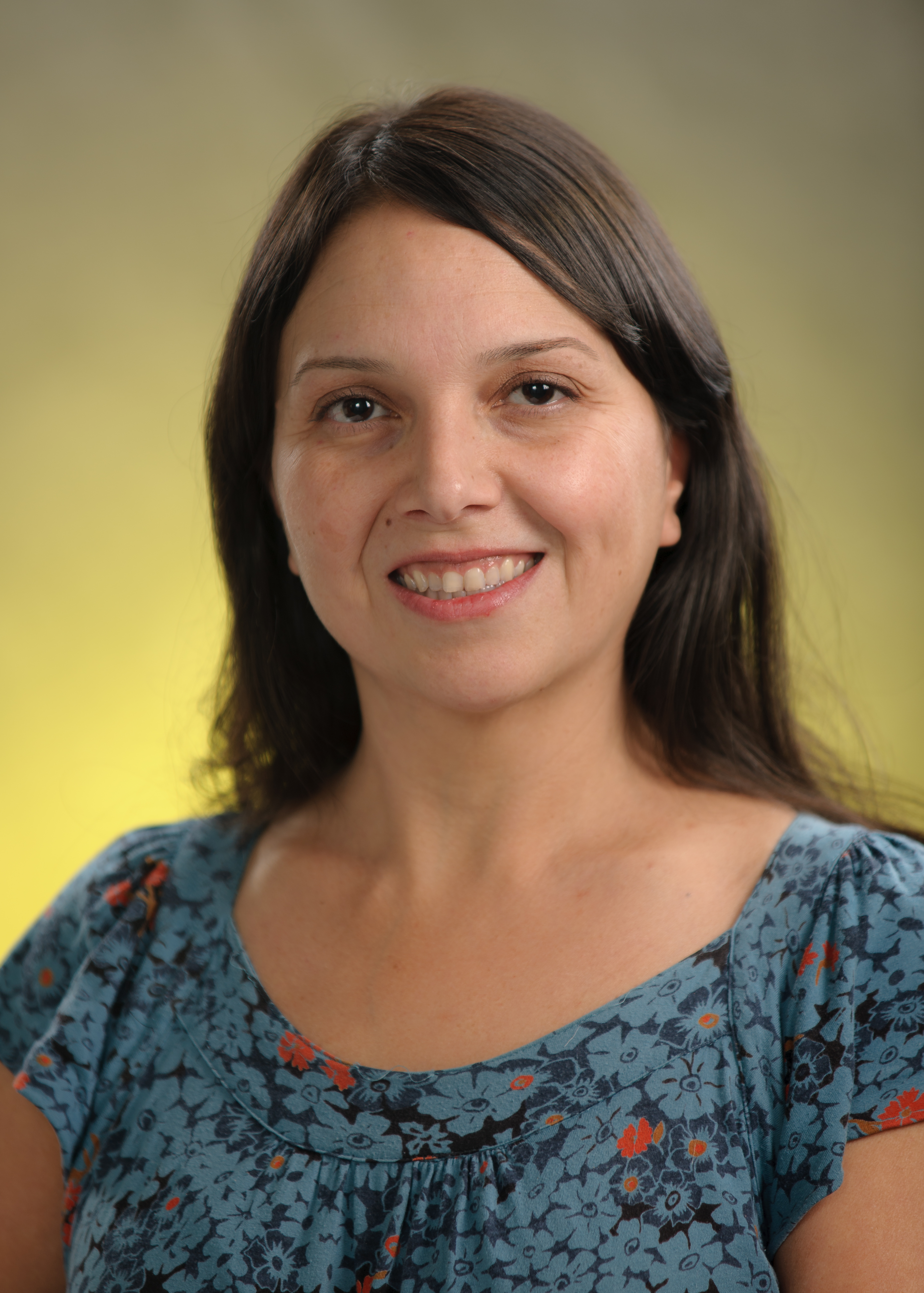
- Quintana backed by an artist's impression of Kepler 186f
- Born: 1973 (age 52–53)
- Education: University of Michigan, Grossmont College, University of California at San Diego
- Known for: Astronomy
- Scientific career
- Fields: Astronomy
- Workplaces: Astrophysicist NASA Goddard Space Flight Center
- Doctoral advisor: Fred Adams

Elisa Victoria Quintana is an American scientist working in the field of astronomy and planetary science at NASA Goddard Space Flight Center. Her research focuses the detection and characterization of exoplanets in addition to studying how they form. She is best known for the detection of Kepler 186f, the first Earth-sized planet found in the habitable zone of a star other than the Sun.

== Early life and education ==
Quintana was born in Silver City, New Mexico. Her father Leroy Quintana, is a Chicano poet and her grandfather was a miner who appeared in blacklisted movie Salt of the Earth. Aged 9 she moved to San Diego. She attended Grossmont College and transferred to the University of California at San Diego where she obtained a Bachelor of Science degree in Physics. During her time as an undergraduate Quintana worked on astrodynamics the KidSat program (later renamed EarthKAM) with first US woman astronaut Sally Ride who was a professor in San Diego.

She received Master's degrees in both Aerospace Science and Physics from the University of Michigan and earned her PhD in Physics from the University of Michigan in 2004. Her PhD thesis for on the topic of planet formation in binary star systems. Quintana was amongst the first people to study whether planets could form in the Alpha Centauri system.

== Academic career ==
Quintana was a member of the NASA Kepler Mission Team at NASA Ames Research Center from 2006 to 2017. She worked as a scientific programmer developing the Kepler pipeline, for which she was awarded the NASA Software of the Year in 2010. She was part of the team that discovered the first rocky exoplanet Kepler-10b, the first exoplanet to orbit the habitable zone of another star Kepler-22b, and the first Earth-sized exoplanet Kepler-20e. In 2014, she led the team that discovered Kepler-186f, an earth-sized exoplanet orbiting in the habitable zone of a red dwarf star; research into the discovery was published in the journal Science.

Quintana has been studying the frequency of giant impacts on exoplanets and comparing how their frequency compares with Earth. In 2017, she moved to the Goddard Space Flight Center in Maryland, where she serves as Deputy Project Scientist for the Nancy Grace Roman Space Telescope (formerly known as the Wide Field Infrared Survey Telescope) and Deputy Project Scientist for the Transiting Exoplanet Survey Satellite.

Quintana is one of the few female Hispanic scientists in astronomy.

== Awards and honors ==
- 2014 Lupe Ontiveros Dream Award.
- 2015 Scientist of the Year award from Great Minds in STEM for the discovery of Kepler-186f
- 2019 Goddard Space Flight Center Honors Award - Leadership
- 2020 Honor Award - Equal Employment Opportunity Medal

== Selected publications ==
Elisa Quintana has published numerous publications on topics in astronomy, specifically the Kepler mission.

- Borucki, W. J., Koch, D., Quintana, E., Basri, G., Batalha, N., Brown, T., Caldwell, D., ... & Prsa, A. (2010). Kepler planet-detection mission: introduction and first results. Science, 327(5968), 977-980.
- Koch, D. G., Borucki, W. J., Quintana, E., Basri, G., Batalha, N. M., Brown, T. M., Caldwell, D., ... & Wu, H. (2010). Kepler mission design, realized photometric performance, and early science. The Astrophysical Journal Letters, 713(2), L79.
- Jenkins, J. M., Caldwell, D. A., Chandrasekaran, H., Twicken, J. D., Bryson, S. T., Quintana, E. V., ... & Borucki, W. J. (2010). Overview of the Kepler science processing pipeline. The Astrophysical Journal Letters, 713(2), L87.
- Quintana, E. V., Adams, F. C., Lissauer, J. J., & Chambers, J. E. (2007). Terrestrial planet formation around individual stars within binary star systems. The Astrophysical Journal, 660(1), 807.
