= Kepler-442 =

K-type main sequence star in the constellation Lyra

Observation data Epoch J2000 Equinox ICRS
- Constellation: Lyra
- Right ascension: 19^{h} 01^{m} 27.9743^{s}
- Declination: +39° 16′ 48.224″
- Apparent magnitude (V): 14.976

Characteristics
- Evolutionary stage: Main sequence
- Spectral type: K5V

Astrometry
Proper motion (μ)	RA: 7.784(18) mas/yr Dec.: 1.882(19) mas/yr
Parallax (π)	2.7269±0.0165 mas
Distance	1,196 ± 7 ly (367 ± 2 pc)
Absolute magnitude (M_{V})	7.73+0.28 −0.25

Details
Mass	0.61 ± 0.03 M_{☉}
Radius	0.60 ± 0.02 R_{☉}
Luminosity (bolometric)	0.117 L_{☉}
Luminosity (visual, L_{V})	0.069 (Note: With the absolute visual magnitude of Kepler-442, $\scriptstyle M_{V_{\ast}} = 7.73$, and the Sun, $\scriptstyle M_{V_{\odot}} = 4.83$, the visual luminosity of Kepler-442 is calculated from: $\scriptstyle \frac{L_{V_{\ast}}}{L_{V_{\odot}}} = 10^{0.4\left(M_{V_{\odot}} - M_{V_{\ast}}\right)}$) L_{☉}
Temperature	4402 ± 100 K
Metallicity [Fe/H]	−0.37 ± 0.10 dex
Age	2.9+8.1 −0.2 Gyr

Other designations
- KOI-4742, KIC 4138008, 2MASS J19012797+3916482, Gaia DR2 2100258047339711488

Database references
SIMBAD	data

Kepler-442 is a K-type main-sequence star approximately 1,196 light years from Earth in the constellation Lyra. It is located within the field of vision of the Kepler spacecraft, the satellite that NASA's Kepler Mission used to detect planets that may be transiting their stars. On January 6, 2015, along with the stars of Kepler-438 and Kepler-440, it was announced that the star has an extrasolar planet (a super-Earth) orbiting within the habitable zone, named Kepler-442b.

== Nomenclature and history ==
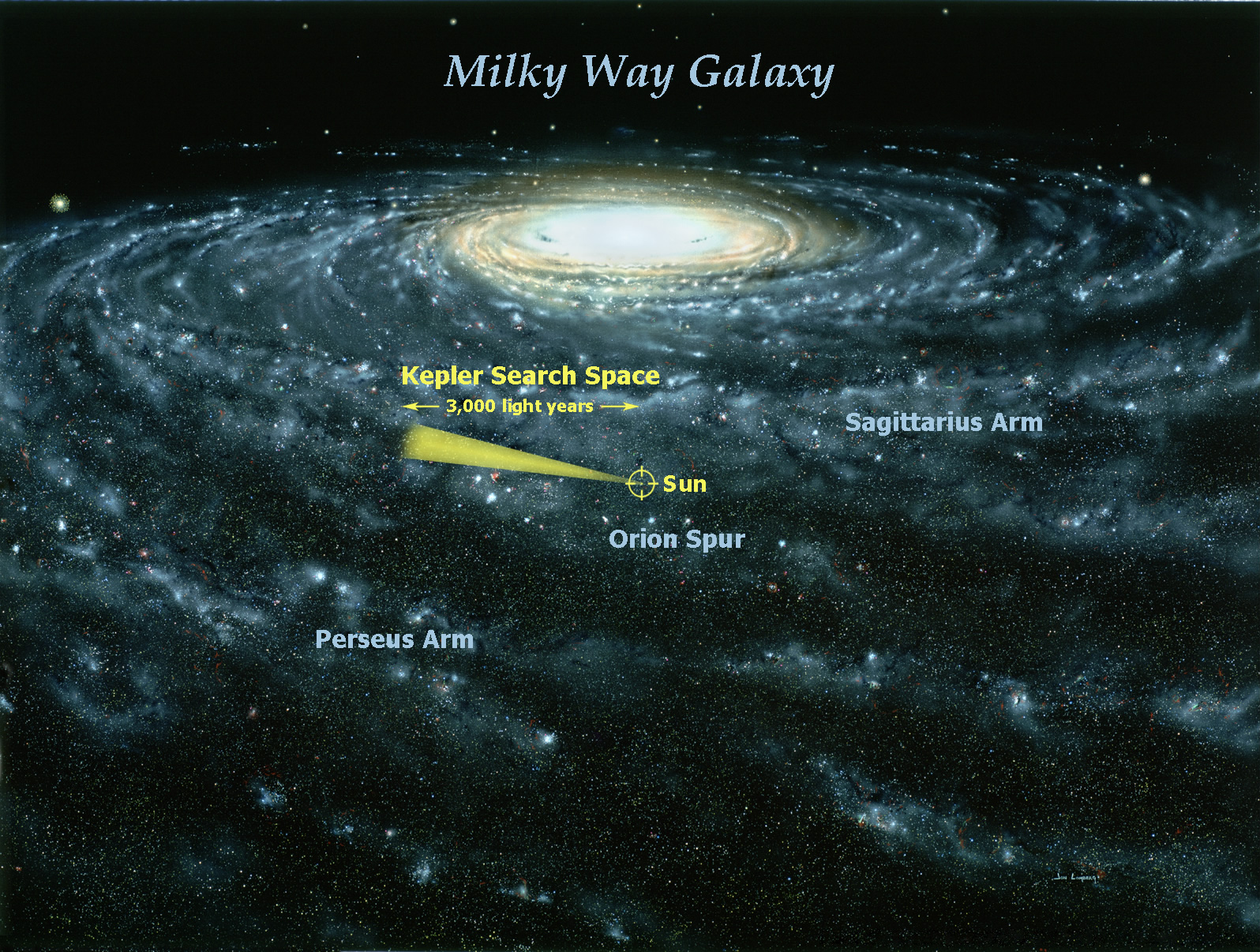
The Kepler Space Telescope search volume, in the context of the Milky Way Galaxy.

Prior to Kepler observation, Kepler-442 had the 2MASS catalogue number 2MASS J19012797+3916482. In the Kepler Input Catalog it has the designation of KIC 4138008, and when it was found to have transiting planet candidates it was given the Kepler object of interest number of KOI-4742.

Planetary candidates were detected around the star by NASA's Kepler Mission, a mission tasked with discovering planets in transit around their stars. The transit method that Kepler uses involves detecting dips in brightness in stars. These dips in brightness can be interpreted as planets whose orbits pass in front of their stars from the perspective of Earth, although other phenomenon can also be responsible which is why the term planetary candidate is used.

Following the acceptance of the discovery paper, the Kepler team provided an additional moniker for the system of "Kepler-442". The discoverers referred to the star as Kepler-442, which is the normal procedure for naming the exoplanets discovered by the spacecraft. Hence, this is the name used by the public to refer to the star and its planet.

Candidate planets that are associated with stars studied by the Kepler Mission are assigned the designations ".01" etc. after the star's name, in the order of discovery. If planet candidates are detected simultaneously, then the ordering follows the order of orbital periods from shortest to longest. Following these rules, there was only candidate planet were detected, with an orbital period of 112.3053 days.

The designation b derive from the order of discovery. The designation of b is given to the first planet orbiting a given star, followed by the other lowercase letters of the alphabet. In the case of Kepler-442, there was only one planet detected, so only the letter b is used. The name Kepler-442 derives directly from the fact that the star is the catalogued 442nd star discovered by Kepler to have confirmed planets.

== Stellar characteristics ==
Kepler-442 is a K-type main sequence star that is approximately 61% the mass of and 60% the radius of the Sun. It has a temperature of 4402 K and is about 2.9 billion years old, but the margin of error here is quite large. In comparison, the Sun is about 4.6 billion years old and has a temperature of 5778 K.

The star is somewhat poor in metals, with a metallicity ([Fe/H]) of about –0.37, or about 43% of the amount of iron and other heavier metals found in the Sun. The star's luminosity is a bit low for a star like Kepler-442, with a luminosity of around 12% of that of the solar luminosity.

Kepler-442 orbits a star with an apparent magnitude of 14.976, rendering it too faint to be visible to the naked eye from Earth. This dimness, as well as its distance from Earth, poses a challenge for direct observation.

== Planetary system ==
The Kepler-442 planetary system
Companion (in order from star)	Mass	Semimajor axis (AU)	Orbital period (days)	Eccentricity	Inclination (°)	Radius
b	2.3^{+5.9}_{−1.3} M_{🜨}	0.409^{+0.209}_{−0.060}	112.3053^{+0.0024}_{−0.0028}	0.04^{+0.08}_{−0.04}	89.94^{+0.06}_{−0.12}	1.34^{+0.11}_{−0.18} R_{🜨}

The only known planet transits the star; this means that the planet's orbit appear to cross in front of their star as viewed from the Earth's perspective. Its inclination relative to Earth's line of sight, or how far above or below the plane of sight it is, vary by less than one degree. This allows direct measurements of the planet's periods and relative diameters (compared to the host star) by monitoring the planet's transit of the star.

Kepler-442b is a super-Earth with a radius 1.34 times that of Earth, and orbits well within the habitable zone. It is likely a rocky planet due to its radius. According to NASA, it was described as being one of the most Earth-like planets, in terms of size and temperature, yet found. It is just outside of the zone (around 0.362 AU) where tidal forces from its host star would be enough to tidally lock it.

== See also ==
- Kepler Mission
- List of planetary systems
