= Kepler-296f =

Goldilocks super-Earth orbiting Kepler-296

Discovery
- Discovery site: Kepler Space Observatory
- Discovery date: 2014
- Detection method: Transit

Orbital characteristics
- Semi-major axis: 0.26300 AU (39,344,000 km)
- Orbital period (sidereal): 63.33587900 d
- Inclination: 89.950
- Star: Kepler-296

Physical characteristics
- Mean radius: 1.790 R_{🜨}
- Temperature: 194 K (−79 °C; −110 °F)

Kepler-296f (also known by its Kepler Object of Interest designation KOI-1422.04) is a confirmed super-Earth exoplanet orbiting within the habitable zone of Kepler-296. The planet was discovered by NASA's Kepler spacecraft using the transit method, in which the dimming effect that a planet causes as it crosses in front of its star is measured. NASA announced the discovery of the exoplanet on 26 February 2014.

== Confirmed exoplanet ==
Kepler 296f is a super-Earth with a radius 1.79 times that of Earth. The planet orbits Kepler-296 once every 63.3 days.

== Habitability ==
The planet is located within the habitable zone of Kepler-296, a region where liquid water could exist on the surface of the planet.

Notable Exoplanets – Kepler Space Telescope
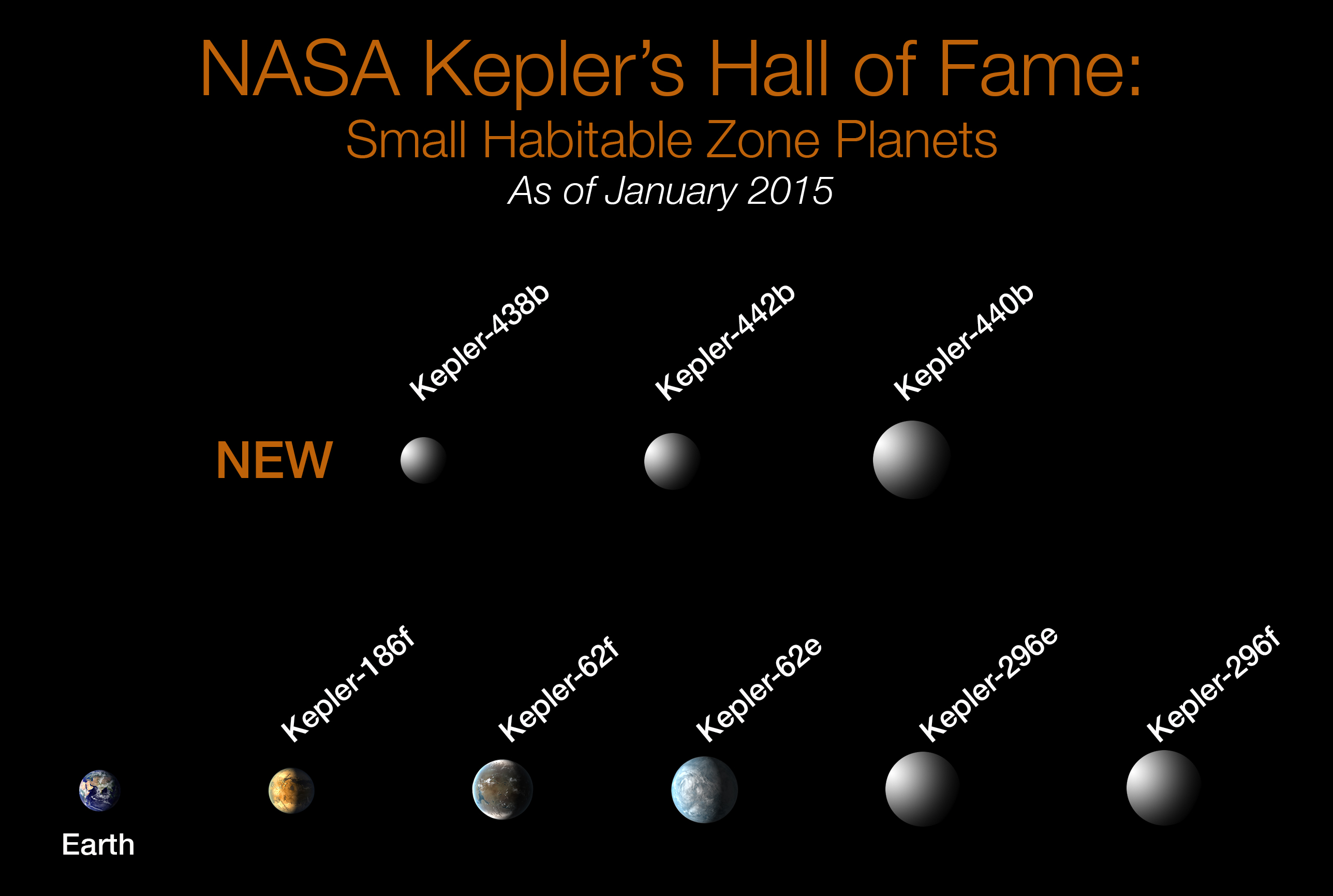
Confirmed small exoplanets in habitable zones.
(Kepler-62e, Kepler-62f, Kepler-186f, Kepler-296e, Kepler-296f, Kepler-438b, Kepler-440b, Kepler-442b)
(Kepler Space Telescope; 6 January 2015).

== See also ==
- Habitability of red dwarf systems
- List of potentially habitable exoplanets
