= Kepler-440b =

Extrasolar planet

Discovery
- Discovery site: Kepler Space Observatory
- Discovery date: 2015
- Detection method: Transit

Orbital characteristics
- Semi-major axis: 0.24200 AU (36,203,000 km)
- Eccentricity: >0.340
- Orbital period (sidereal): 101.11141000 d
- Inclination: 89.930
- Star: Kepler-440

Physical characteristics
- Mean radius: 1.860 R_{🜨}
- Temperature: 273 K (0 °C; 32 °F).

Kepler-440b (also known by its Kepler Object of Interest designation KOI-4087.01) is a confirmed super-Earth exoplanet orbiting within the habitable zone of Kepler-440, about 850 light-years (261 pc) from Earth. The planet was discovered by NASA's Kepler spacecraft using the transit method, in which the dimming effect that a planet causes as it crosses in front of its star is measured. NASA announced the confirmation of the exoplanet on 6 January 2015.

== Confirmed exoplanet ==
Kepler-440b is a [super-Earth] with a radius 1.86 times that of Earth. The planet orbits Kepler-440 once every 101.1 days.

== Habitability ==
The planet was announced as being located within the habitable zone of Kepler-440, a region where liquid water could exist on the surface of the planet.

Notable Exoplanets – Kepler Space Telescope
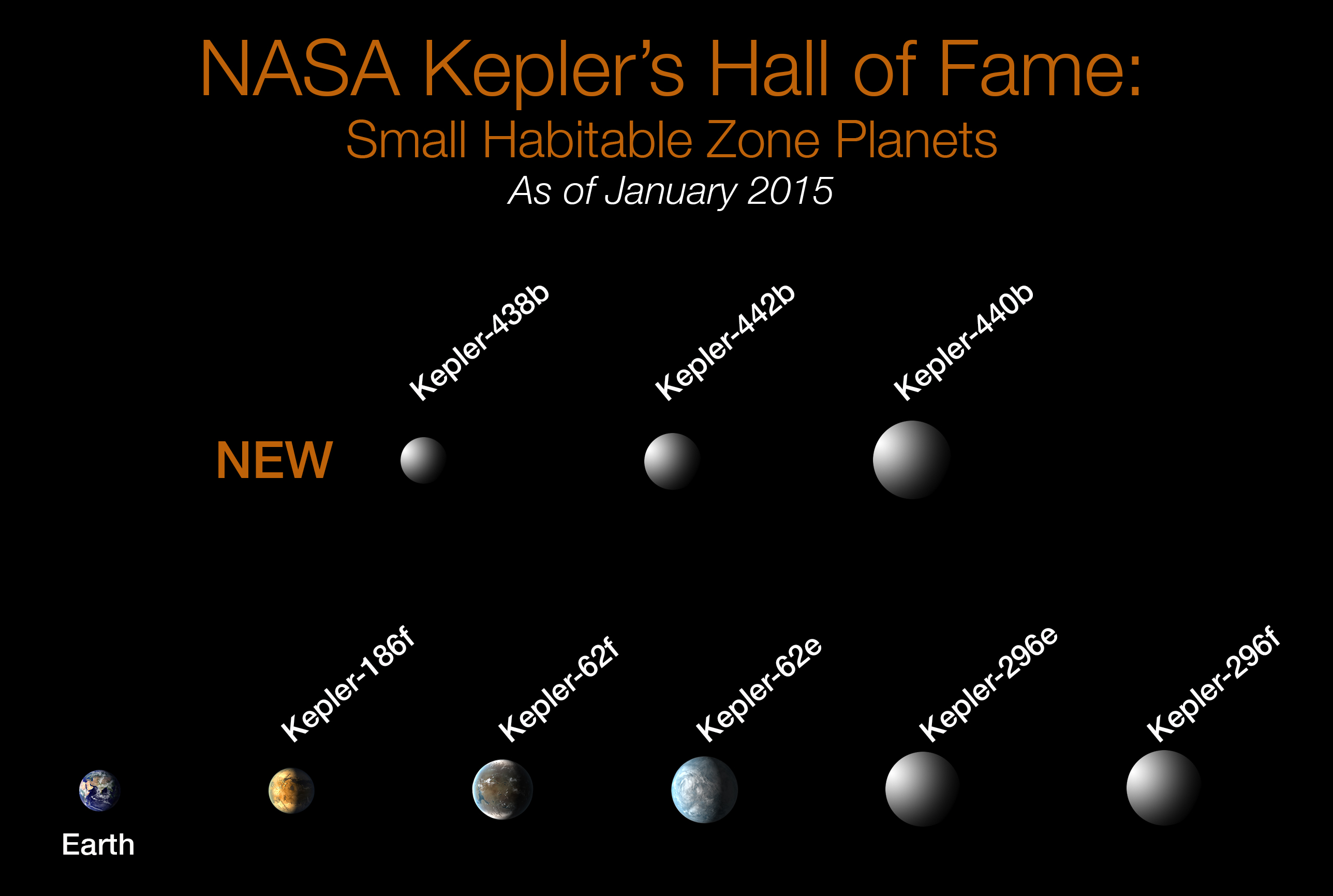
Confirmed small exoplanets in habitable zones.
(Kepler-62e, Kepler-62f, Kepler-186f, Kepler-296e, Kepler-296f, Kepler-438b, Kepler-440b, Kepler-442b)
(Kepler Space Telescope; 6 January 2015).

Size comparison
| Earth | Kepler-440b |
|---|---|
| | Exoplanet |

== See also ==
- Habitability of K-type main-sequence star systems
- List of potentially habitable exoplanets
