= Kepler-438 =

Red dwarf in the constellation Lyra

Observation data Epoch J2000 Equinox J2000
- Constellation: Lyra
- Right ascension: 18^{h} 46^{m} 34.9968^{s}
- Declination: +41° 57′ 03.934″
- Apparent magnitude (V): 15.0

Characteristics
- Variable type: Flare star

Astrometry
Proper motion (μ)	RA: −16.649(115) mas/yr Dec.: −5.614(111) mas/yr
Parallax (π)	5.5592±0.0984 mas
Distance	590 ± 10 ly (180 ± 3 pc)
Absolute magnitude (M_{V})	9.55+0.54 −0.44

Details
Mass	0.544+0.061 −0.041 M_{☉}
Radius	0.52+0.061 −0.038 R_{☉}
Luminosity	0.044+0.017 −0.012 L_{☉}
Surface gravity (log g)	4.74 cgs
Temperature	3748±112 K
Metallicity [Fe/H]	0.16±0.14 dex
Age	4.4+0.7 −0.8 Gyr

Other designations
- KIC 6497146, KOI-3284, 2MASS J18463499+4157039

Database references
SIMBAD	data
KIC	data

Kepler-438 is a red dwarf in the constellation Lyra, about 590 light years from Earth. It is notable for its planetary system, which includes Kepler-438b, a possibly Earth-size planet within Kepler-438's habitable zone. Kepler-438 is a flare star that undergoes random, dramatic increases in brightness due to flare activity. It emits strong superflares every few hundred days, with each flare being stronger than the most powerful flare recorded on the Sun.

== Planetary system ==
The system has one confirmed planet. However, transit timing observations of Kepler-438b indicate the possible presence of additional planets.

The Kepler-438 planetary system
Companion (in order from star)	Mass	Semimajor axis (AU)	Orbital period (days)	Eccentricity	Inclination	Radius
b	—	0.166 ^{+0.051}_{−0.042}	35.23319 ^{+0.00025}_{−0.00029}	0.03 ^{+0.10}_{−0.03}	89.86 ^{+0.14}_{−0.32}°	1.12 ^{+0.16}_{−0.17} R_{🜨}

In 2022, a preprint described a narrowband radio signal that "[met] initial criteria for extraterrestrial intelligence" emitted from one of the Kepler-438 planets and received by astronomers at the Five-hundred-meter Aperture Spherical Telescope (FAST) in China. The signal was later determined to be of terrestrial origin.
