= Kepler-452 =

G-type main-sequence star in the constellation Cygnus

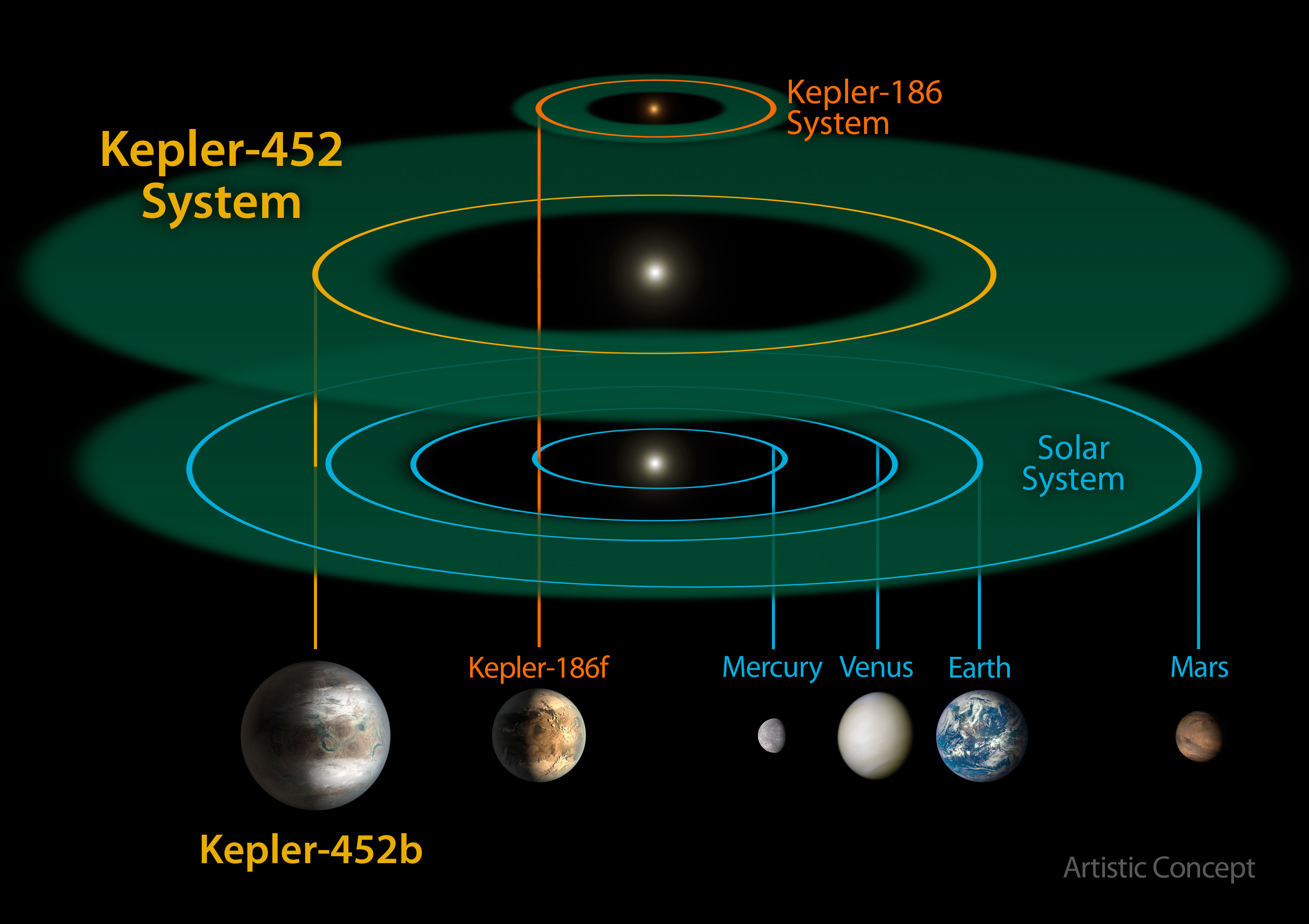
- Artist's impression of the Kepler-452 and Kepler-186 systems compared to the inner Solar System, with their respective habitable zones shown.

Observation data Epoch J2000 Equinox ICRS
- Constellation: Cygnus
- Right ascension: 19^{h} 44^{m} 00.8861^{s}
- Declination: +44° 16′ 39.171″
- Apparent magnitude (V): 13.426

Characteristics
- Evolutionary stage: subgiant
- Spectral type: G2IV or G2V

Astrometry
Proper motion (μ)	RA: 9.987(13) mas/yr Dec.: 8.943(14) mas/yr
Parallax (π)	1.8053±0.0103 mas
Distance	1,810 ± 10 ly (554 ± 3 pc)

Details
Mass	1.037^{+0.054}_{−0.047} M_{☉}
Radius	1.11^{+0.15}_{−0.09} R_{☉}
Luminosity	1.10±0.01 L_{☉}
Surface gravity (log g)	4.32±0.09 cgs
Temperature	5,757±85 K
Metallicity [Fe/H]	0.21±0.09 dex
Age	6±2 Gyr

Other designations
- KOI-7016, KIC 8311864, GSC 3148-814, 2MASS J19440088+4416392, Gaia DR2 2079597124345617280

Database references
SIMBAD	data
Exoplanet Archive	data
KIC	data
Extrasolar Planets; Encyclopaedia	data

Kepler-452 is a G-type subgiant star located about 1,810 light-years away from Earth in the constellation Cygnus. Although similar in temperature to the Sun, it is 20% brighter, 3.7% more massive and 11% larger. Alongside this, the star is approximately six billion years old and possesses a high metallicity.

== Nomenclature and history ==
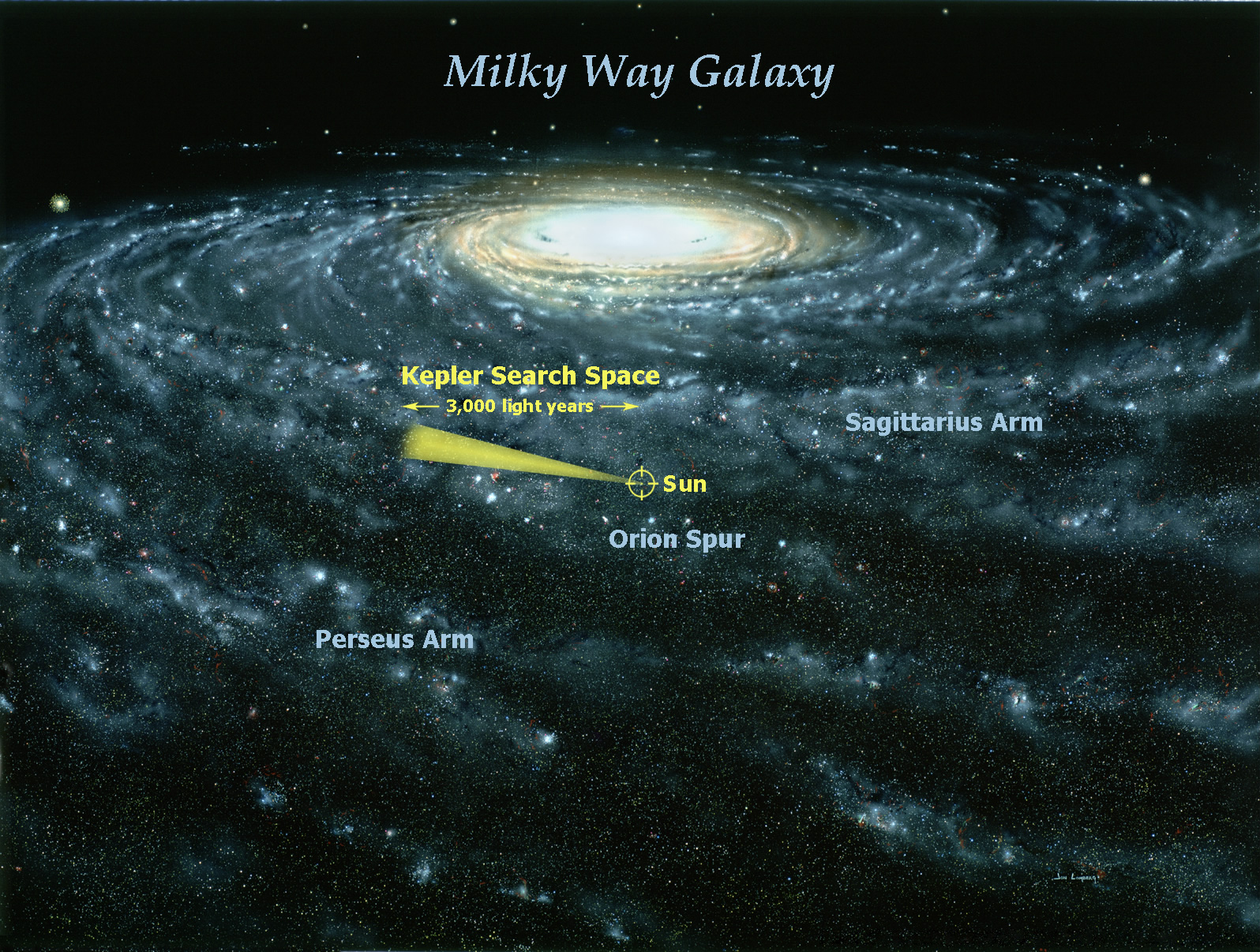
The Kepler Space Telescope search volume, in the context of the Milky Way Galaxy.

Prior to Kepler observation, Kepler-452 had the 2MASS catalogue number 2MASS 19440088+4416392. In the Kepler Input Catalog, it has the designation of KIC 8311864. When it was found to have a transiting planet candidate, it was given the Kepler object of interest number of KOI-7016.

Planetary candidates were detected around the star by NASA's Kepler Mission, a mission tasked with discovering planets in transit around their stars. The transit method that Kepler uses involves detecting dips in brightness of stars. These dips in brightness can be interpreted as planets whose orbits pass in front of their stars from the perspective of Earth, although other phenomena can also be responsible which is why the term "planetary candidate" is used.

Following the acceptance of the discovery paper, the Kepler team referred to the star as Kepler-452, which is the normal procedure for naming exoplanets discovered by the spacecraft. Hence, this is the name usually used by the public to refer to the star and its planet.

Candidate planets that are associated with stars studied by the Kepler Mission are assigned the designations ".01", ".02", and so on, after the star's name, in the order of discovery. If planet candidates are detected simultaneously, then the ordering follows the order of orbital periods from shortest to longest. Following these rules, there was only one candidate planet detected, with an orbital period of 384.843 days. The name Kepler-452 derives directly from the fact that the star is the catalogued 452nd star discovered by Kepler to have confirmed planets.

The designation b, derives from the order of discovery. The designation of b is given to the first planet orbiting a given star, followed by the other lowercase letters of the alphabet. In the case of Kepler-452, there was only one planet, so only the letter b is used.

== Stellar characteristics ==
Kepler-452 is a G-type star that is approximately 104% the mass of and 111% the radius of the Sun. It has a temperature of 5757 K and is roughly 6 billion years old. In comparison, the Sun is about 4.6 billion years old and has a temperature of 5778 K.

The star is metal-rich, with a metallicity (Fe/H) of about 0.21, or about 162% of the amount of iron and other heavier metals found in the Sun. The star's luminosity is somewhat normal for a star like Kepler-452, with a luminosity of around 120% of that of the solar luminosity.

The star's apparent magnitude, or how bright it appears from Earth's perspective, is 13.426. Therefore, it is too dim to be seen with the naked eye.

== Planetary system ==
The Kepler-452 planetary system
Companion (in order from star)	Mass	Semimajor axis (AU)	Orbital period (days)	Eccentricity	Inclination (°)	Radius
b	~5±2 M_{🜨}	1.046^{+0.019}_{−0.015}	384.843^{+0.007}_{−0.012}	—	89.806^{+0.134}_{−0.049}	1.5^{+0.32}_{−0.22} R_{🜨}

The star hosts one exoplanet, Kepler-452b, discovered in July 2015 by the Kepler spacecraft. This planet is mostly known for its characteristics similar to Earth, most notably its size, orbit and stellar flux. It is the first potentially rocky super-Earth planet discovered orbiting within the habitable zone and the abiogenesis zone of a star very similar to the Sun. It may even have a surface temperature similar to that of Earth (the planet has an equilibrium temperature of approximately 265 K (−8 °C; 17 °F) (Earth's equilibrium temperature is only 10 K cooler than this). However, its star is 6 billion years old (roughly 1.5 billion years older than the Sun). Due to this, Kepler-452b is receiving roughly 10% more stellar radiation than the Earth does today. If Kepler-452b is a rocky planet, it might be subject to a runaway greenhouse effect. However, because of its mass (estimated to be about 5 M_{🜨}), it may be able to prevent succumbing to the runaway greenhouse for a limited amount of time (at most about 500 million years). Nevertheless, the planet is one of the most Earth-like planets discovered so far by the Kepler team. Both the Earth and Kepler-452b are at just the right distances from their stars so that water can be liquid, at a temperature between 0 °C and 100 °C.

== Sun comparison ==
This table compares the Sun to Kepler-452.

Identifier	Distance (ly)	Stellar Class	Temperature (K)	Metallicity (dex)	Age (Gyr)	Notes
Sun	0.00	G2V	5,778	+0.00	4.6	
Kepler-452	1,800	G2V	5,757	+0.21	6.0	
