= K2-72b =

Extrasolar planet

Discovery
- Discovery date: July 18, 2016
- Detection method: Transit

Orbital characteristics
- Semi-major axis: 0.0370 ± 0.0047 AU (5,540,000 ± 700,000 km)
- Orbital period (sidereal): 5.57739±0.00068 d
- Star: K2-72

Physical characteristics
- Mean radius: 0.067±0.018 R_{J} 0.75±0.20 R_{🜨}

K2-72b is a small exoplanet orbiting around the red dwarf star K2-72 approximately 227.7 light-years away. K2-72b completes an orbit in 5.57 days, and it has a radius of only 75% of that of the Earth.
