= K2-72c =

Extrasolar planet

Discovery
- Discovery date: July 18, 2016
- Detection method: Transit

Orbital characteristics
- Semi-major axis: 0.0722 ± 0.0091 AU (10,800,000 ± 1,360,000 km)
- Orbital period (sidereal): 15.1871±0.0032 d
- Star: K2-72

Physical characteristics
- Mean radius: 0.860±0.220 R_{🜨}

K2-72c is a small exoplanet orbiting around the red dwarf star K2-72 approximately 227.7 light-years away. It is located in the inner edge of the habitable zone. K2-72c completes an orbit in 15.2 days, and it has a radius of only 86% of that of the Earth.

== Host star ==
The planet orbits a (M-type) red dwarf star named K2-72, orbited by a total of four planets, of which K2-72e has the longest orbital period. The star has a mass of 0.27 M_{☉} and a radius of 0.33 R_{☉}. It has a temperature of 3360 K and its age is unknown. In comparison, the Sun is 4.6 billion years old and has a surface temperature of 5778 K.

The star's apparent magnitude, or how bright it appears from Earth's perspective, is 15.309. Therefore, it is too dim to be seen with the naked eye and can only be observed with a telescope.

== Discovery ==
The planet, along with the other three planets in the K2-72 system, were announced in mid-July 2016 as part of the new results from the second mission of the Kepler spacecraft.
