= K2-72 =

Star in the constellation Aquarius

Observation data Epoch J2000 Equinox ICRS
- Constellation: Aquarius
- Right ascension: 22^{h} 18^{m} 29.25485^{s}
- Declination: −09° 36′ 44.3811″
- Apparent magnitude (V): 15.37

Characteristics
- Evolutionary stage: main sequence
- Spectral type: M2V

Astrometry
Radial velocity (R_{v})	−42.92±3.35 km/s
Proper motion (μ)	RA: 195.834 mas/yr Dec.: 74.259 mas/yr
Parallax (π)	15.0346±0.0277 mas
Distance	216.9 ± 0.4 ly (66.5 ± 0.1 pc)

Details
Mass	0.27^{+0.08}_{−0.09} M_{☉}
Radius	0.33±0.03 R_{☉}
Luminosity	0.0134 L_{☉}
Surface gravity (log g)	4.83±0.14 cgs
Temperature	3360^{+87}_{−86} K
Rotational velocity (v sin i)	6.07 km/s
Age	1.0 Gyr

Other designations
- EPIC 206209135, 2MASS J22182923-0936444

Database references
SIMBAD	data
Exoplanet Archive	data

K2-72 (also designated EPIC 206209135) is a cool red dwarf star of spectral class M2V located about 217 light-years (67 parsecs) away from the Earth in the constellation of Aquarius. It is known to host four planets, all similar in size to Earth, with one of them residing within the habitable zone.

== Nomenclature and history ==
K2-72 also has the 2MASS catalogue number J22182923-0936444. Its EPIC (Ecliptic Plane Input Catalog) number is 206209135.

The star's planetary companions were discovered by NASA's Kepler Mission, a mission tasked with discovering planets in transit around their stars. The transit method that Kepler uses involves detecting dips in brightness in stars. These dips in brightness can be interpreted as planets whose orbits move in front of their stars from the perspective of Earth. The name K2-72 derives directly from the fact that the star is the catalogued 72nd star discovered by the K2 mission to have confirmed planets.

The designation b, c, d, and e derives from the order of discovery. The designation of b is given to the first planet orbiting a given star, and e to the last. In the case of K2-72, there were four planets, so only letters b to e are used. At first the planets were all thought to be smaller than Earth. However, in 2017, new analysis by Martinez et al. and Courtney Dressing found that K2-72 was significantly larger than previous estimates, and found that the planets were all larger than Earth, although all are still expected to be rocky.

== Stellar characteristics ==
K2-72 is a M-type star that is approximately 27% the mass of and 33% the radius of the Sun, according to the analysis done by Dressing et al. The results found by Martinez et al. suggest a larger star, with about 36% the radius and mass of the Sun. Both give a luminosity estimate between 0.013 and 0.015 solar luminosities. It has a surface temperature of between 3360 and 3370 K and its age is unknown. In comparison, the Sun is about 4.6 billion years old and has a surface temperature of 5778 K.

The star's apparent magnitude, or how bright it appears from Earth's perspective, is 15.309. Therefore, it is too dim to be seen with the naked eye and can only be observed with a telescope.

== Planetary system ==
The star is known to host four planets, all likely to be rocky. Only one (K2-72e) is currently known to reside inside the habitable zone, although K2-72c may straddle the inner edge.

The K2-72 planetary system
Companion (in order from star)	Mass	Semimajor axis (AU)	Orbital period (days)	Eccentricity	Inclination (°)	Radius
b	—	0.040+0.004 −0.005	5.577212+0.000417 −0.000419	0.110000+0.196982 −0.087659	89.15+0.59 −0.86	1.08±0.11 R_{🜨}
d	—	0.050+0.004 −0.006	7.760178±0.001496	0.110000+0.207832 −0.092330	89.26+0.50 −0.69	1.16±0.13 R_{🜨}
c	—	0.078+0.007 −0.01	15.189034+0.003128 −0.003149	0.110000+0.201970 −0.091536	89.54+0.32 −0.44	1.01±0.12 R_{🜨}
e	—	0.106+0.009 −0.013	24.158868+0.003726 −0.003850	0.110000+0.198676 −0.086832	89.68+0.22 −0.32	1.29+0.14 −0.13 R_{🜨}
