= K2-72e =

Goldilocks terrestrial exoplanet orbiting K2-72

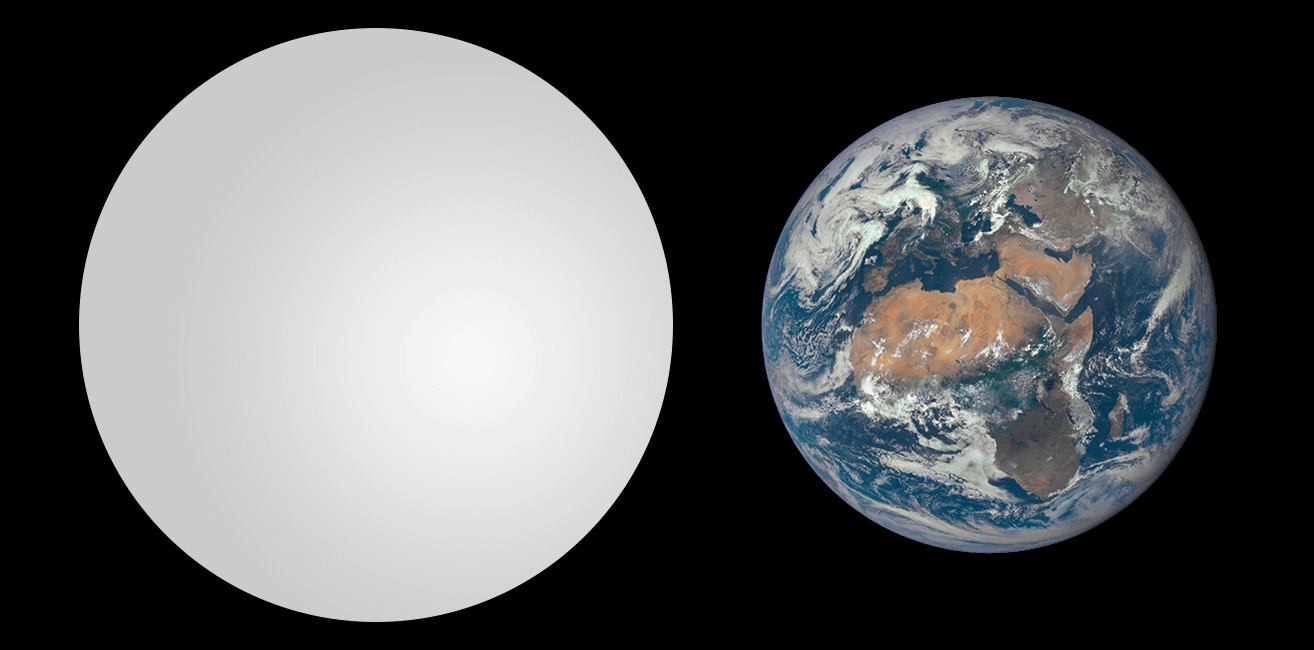
- Size comparison between K2-72e (left) and the Earth.

Discovery
- Discovered by: Crossfield et al.
- Discovery site: Kepler Space Observatory
- Discovery date: July 18, 2016
- Detection method: Transit

Orbital characteristics
- Semi-major axis: 0.106 ^{+0.009}_{−0.013} AU
- Eccentricity: 0.110+0.199 −0.087
- Orbital period (sidereal): 24.159 ±0.004 d
- Star: K2-72

Physical characteristics
- Mean radius: 1.29 ^{+0.14}_{−0.13} R_{🜨}
- Mass: ~2.21 M_{🜨}
- Temperature: 261.15 K (−12.00 °C; 10.40 °F)

K2-72e (also known by its EPIC designation EPIC 206209135.04), is a confirmed exoplanet, likely rocky, orbiting within the habitable zone of the red dwarf star K2-72, the outermost of four such planets discovered in the system by NASA's Kepler spacecraft on its "Second Light" mission. It is located about 217.1 light-years (66.56 parsecs, or nearly 2.0538×10^{15} km) away from Earth in the constellation of Aquarius. The exoplanet was found by using the transit method, in which the dimming effect that a planet causes as it crosses in front of its star is measured.

== Characteristics ==
=== Mass, radius, and temperature ===
K2-72e is an Earth-sized exoplanet, meaning it has a mass and radius close to that of Earth. It has an equilibrium temperature of 261 K (−12 °C; 10 °F). It has a radius of 1.29 R_{🜨}., and a mass of 2.2 M_{🜨}, depending on its composition.

=== Host star ===
The planet orbits a (M-type) red dwarf star named K2-72, orbited by a total of four planets, of which K2-72e has the longest orbital period. The star has a mass of 0.27 M_{☉} and a radius of 0.33 R_{☉}. It has a temperature of 3360 K and its age is unknown. In comparison, the Sun is 4.6 billion years old and has a surface temperature of 5778 K.

The star's apparent magnitude, or how bright it appears from Earth's perspective, is 15.309. Therefore, it is too dim to be seen with the naked eye and can only be observed with a telescope.

=== Orbit ===
K2-72e orbits its host star with an orbital period of 24 days and an orbital radius of about 0.1 times that of Earth's (compared to the distance of Mercury from the Sun, which is about 0.38 AU).

== Habitability ==
The exoplanet, along with K2-72c, were announced to be orbiting in the habitable zone of its parent star, the region where, with the correct conditions and atmospheric properties, liquid water may exist on the surface of the planet. K2-72e has a radius of 1.29 R_{🜨}, so it is likely rocky. Its host star is a red dwarf, with about a fifth as much mass than the Sun does. As a result, stars like K2-72 have the ability to live up to 1–2 trillion years, hundreds of times longer than the Sun will live.

The planet is very likely tidally locked, with one side of its hemisphere permanently facing towards the star, while the opposite side shrouded in eternal darkness.

It receives 11% more insolation than Earth does, so any oceans present are potentially vulnerable to boiling away, therefore possibly reducing the chance of habitability.

== Discovery ==
The planet, along with the other three planets in the K2-72 system, were announced in mid-July 2016 as part of the new results from the second mission of the Kepler spacecraft.

== See also ==
- List of potentially habitable exoplanets
