= Superhabitable world =

Hypothetical type of planet or moon that may be better-suited for life than Earth

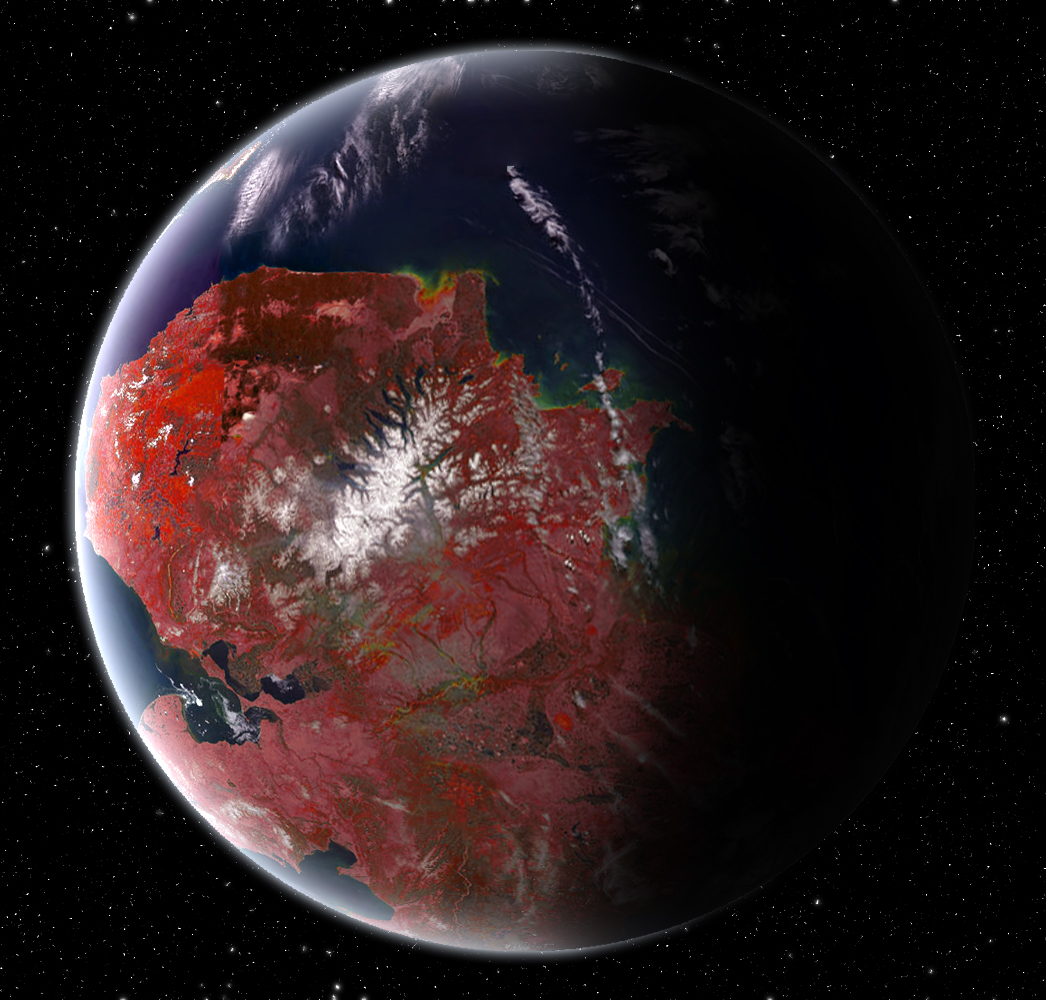
Artist's impression of one possible appearance of a superhabitable planet. The reddish hue is vegetation.

A superhabitable world is a hypothetical type of planet or moon that is better suited than Earth for the emergence and evolution of life. The concept was introduced in a 2014 paper by René Heller and John Armstrong, in which they criticized the language used in the search for habitable exoplanets and proposed clarifications. The authors argued that knowing whether a world is located within the star's habitable zone is insufficient to determine its habitability, and that the prevailing model of characterization was geocentric or anthropocentric in nature. Instead, they proposed a biocentric model that prioritized characteristics affecting the abundance of life and biodiversity on a world's surface.

If a world possesses more diverse flora and fauna than there are on Earth, then it would empirically show that its natural environment is more hospitable to life. To identify such a world, one should consider its geological processes, formation age, atmospheric composition, ocean coverage, and the type of star that it orbits. In other words, a superhabitable world would likely be larger, warmer, and older than Earth, with an evenly-distributed ocean, and orbiting a K-type main-sequence star. In 2020, astronomers, building on Heller and Armstrong's hypothesis, identified 24 potentially superhabitable exoplanets based on measured characteristics that fit these criteria.

== Stellar characteristics ==
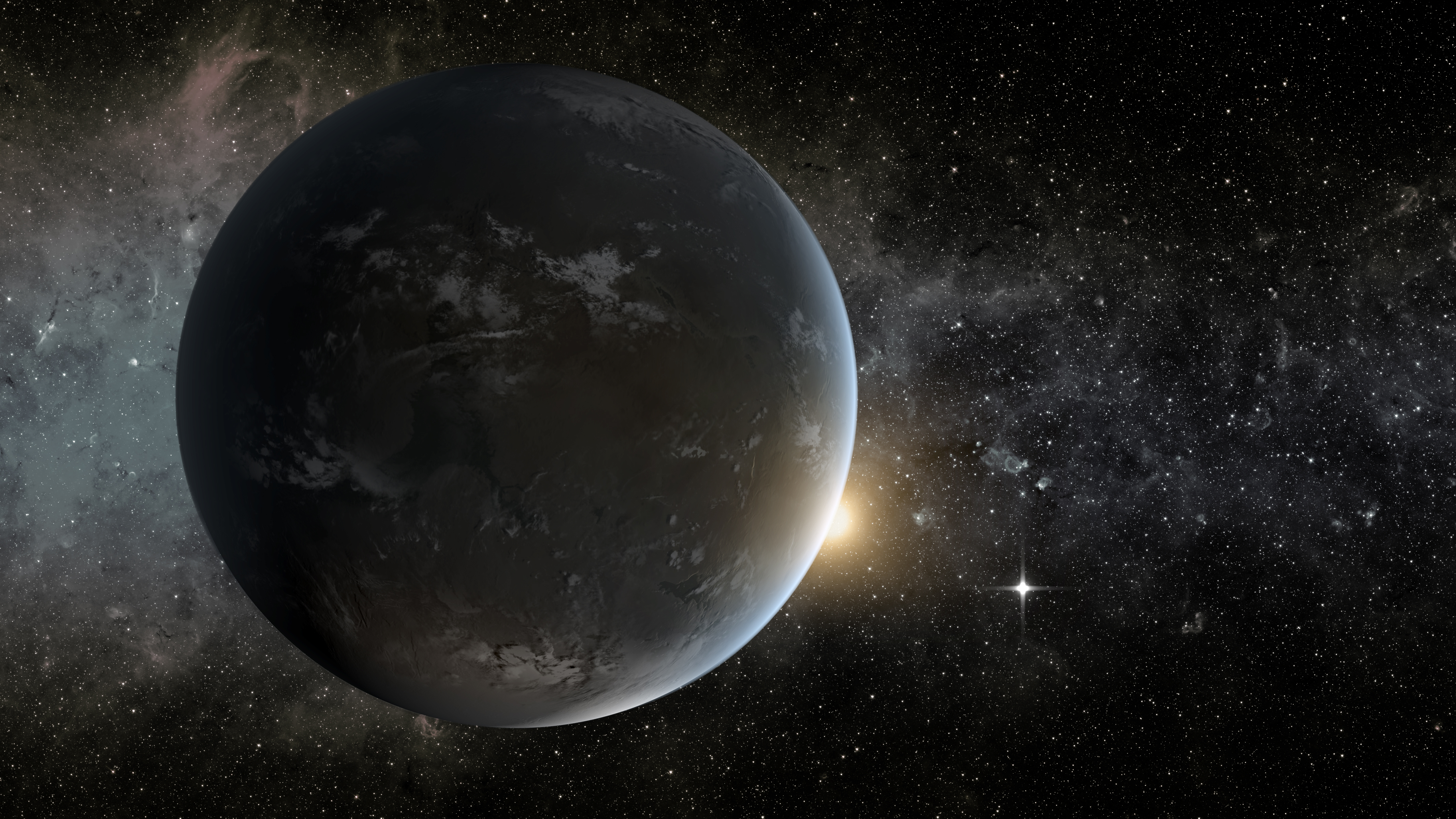
Artist's impression of Kepler-62f orbiting the orange dwarf star Kepler-62

A star's characteristics are a key consideration for planetary habitability. The types of stars generally considered to be potential hosts for habitable worlds include F, G, K, and M-type main-sequence stars. The most massive stars—O, B, and A-type, respectively—have average lifespans on the main sequence that are considered too short for complex life to develop, ranging from a few hundred million years for A-type stars to only a few million years for O-type stars. Thus, F-type stars are described as the "hot limit" for stars that can potentially support life, as their lifespan of 2 to 4 billion years would be sufficient for habitability. However, F-type stars emit large amounts of ultraviolet radiation, and without the presence of a protective ozone layer, could disrupt nucleic acid-based life on a planet's surface.

On the opposite end, the less massive red dwarfs, which generally includes M-type stars, are by far the most common and long-lived stars in the universe, but ongoing research points to serious challenges to their ability to support life. Due to the low luminosity of red dwarfs, the circumstellar habitable zone (HZ) (Note: The habitable zone (HZ) is a region present around each star where a terrestrial planet or moon, given the right physical conditions, could maintain liquid water on its surface.) is in very close proximity to the star, which causes any planet to become tidally locked. The primary concern for researchers, however, is the star's propensity for frequent outbreaks of high-energy radiation, especially early in its life, that could strip away a planet's atmosphere. At the same time, red dwarfs do not emit enough quiescent UV radiation (i.e., UV radiation emitted during inactive periods) to support biological processes like photosynthesis.

Dismissing both ends, astronomers are led to conclude that G and K-type stars—yellow and orange dwarfs, respectively—provide the best life-supporting characteristics. However, a limiting factor to the habitability of yellow dwarfs is their higher emissions of ionizing radiation and shorter lifespans compared to cooler orange dwarfs. Therefore, researchers conclude that orange dwarfs offer the best conditions for a superhabitable world.

Also nicknamed "Goldilocks stars", orange dwarfs emit low enough levels of ultraviolet radiation to eliminate the need for a protective ozone layer, but just enough to contribute to necessary biological processes. Additionally, the long average lifespan of an orange dwarf (18 to 34 billion years, compared to 10 billion for the Sun) provides a more stable habitable zone throughout the star's lifetime, providing more time for life to develop.

== Planetary characteristics ==
=== Age ===
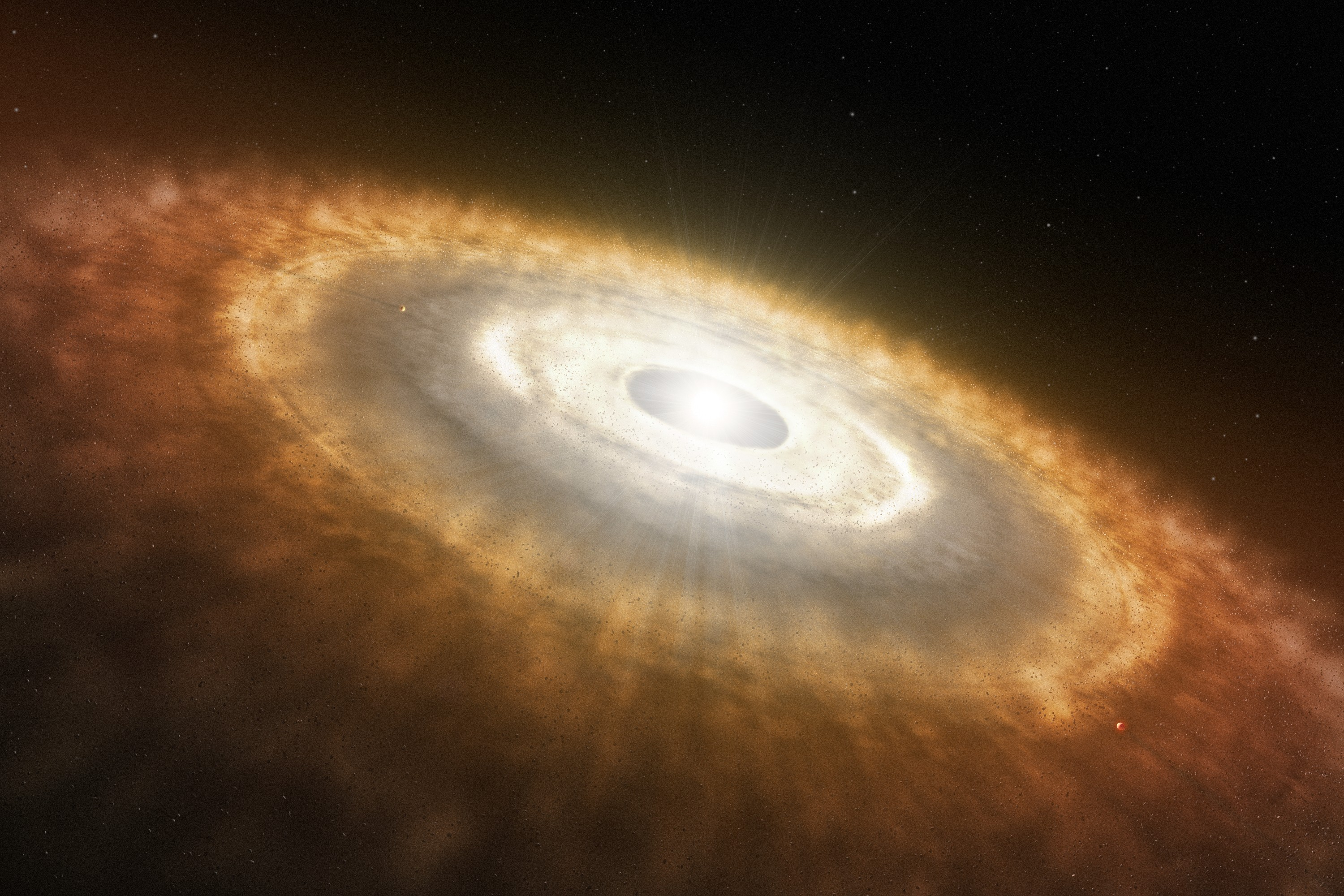
The earliest stars in the universe were metal-free stars, which was initially believed to prevent the formation of rocky planets.

It is necessary for the age of any superhabitable world to be greater than Earth's age (~4.5 billion years). This necessity is based on the belief that as a planet or moon ages, it experiences increasing levels of biodiversity, since native species have had more time to evolve, adapt, and stabilize the environmental conditions suitable for life. However, the eventual exhaustion of a world's internally generated heat means that there is also an upper limit to the age of any habitable world; internal cooling would lead to changes to the average global temperature and atmospheric composition. Therefore, the optimal age range for a superhabitable world would be roughly 5–8 billion years.

=== Orbital characteristics ===
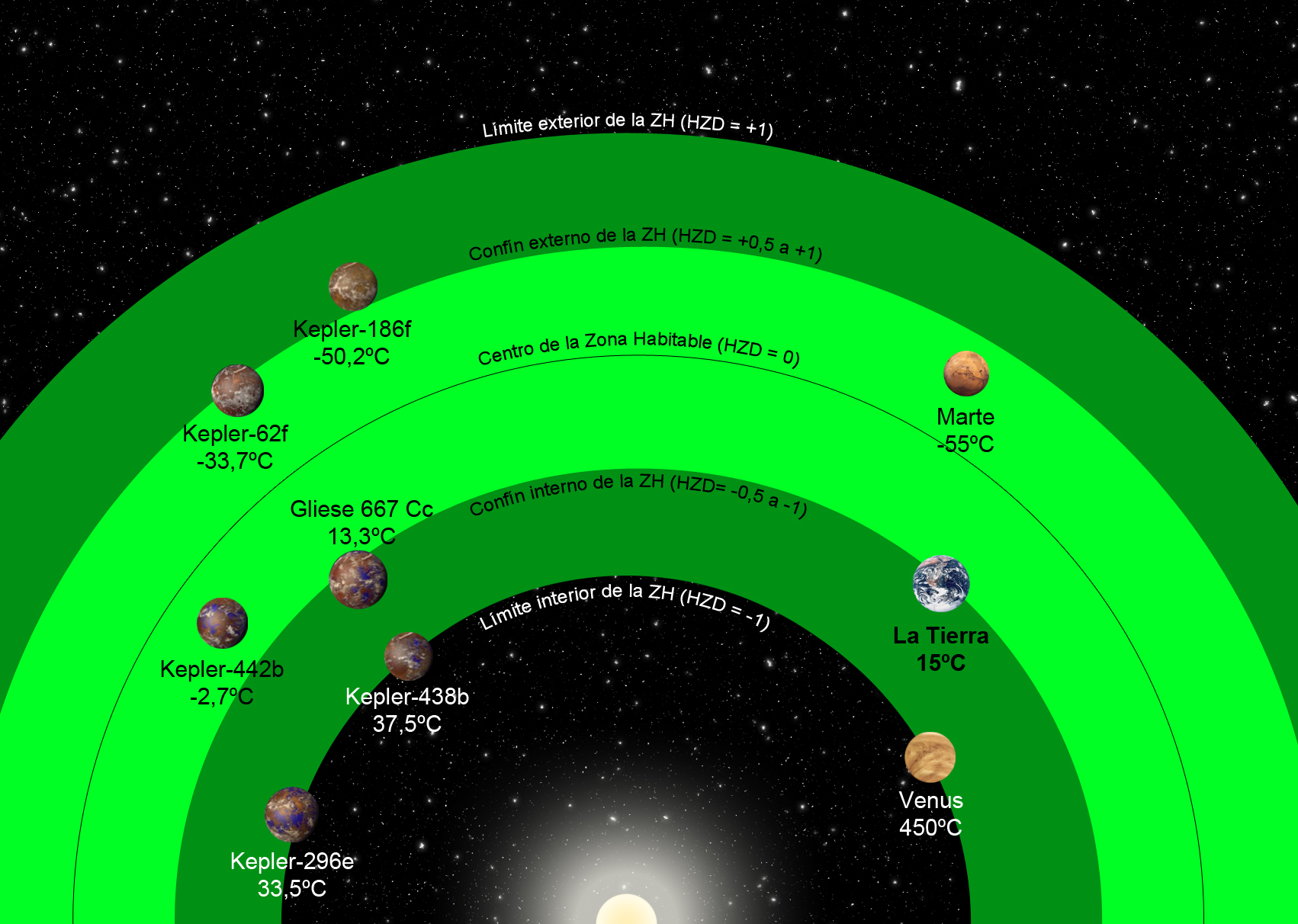
Habitable zone (HZ) position of some of the most similar and average surface temperature exoplanets. (Note: The term "HZD", for "habitable zone distance", marks the position of a planet about the center of the habitable zone of the system (value 0). A negative HZD value means that the orbit of a planet is smaller near its star —the center of the habitable zone— while a positive value means a wider orbit around its star. The values 1 and −1 mark the boundary of the habitable zone. A superhabitable planet should have a HZD of 0 (the optimal location within the habitable zone).)

During the main sequence phase, a star burns hydrogen in its core, producing energy through nuclear fusion. Over time, as the hydrogen fuel is consumed, the star's core contracts and heats up, leading to an increase in the rate of fusion. This causes the star to gradually become more luminous, and as its luminosity increases, the amount of energy it emits grows, pushing the habitable zone (HZ) outward. Studies suggest that Earth's orbit lies near the inner edge of the Solar System's HZ, which could harm its long-term livability as it nears the end of its HZ lifetime.

Ideally, the orbit of a superhabitable world should be further out and closer to the center of the HZ relative to Earth's orbit, but knowing whether a world is in this region is insufficient on its own to determine habitability. Not all rocky planets in the HZ may be habitable, while tidal heating can render planets or moons habitable beyond this region. For example, Jupiter's moon Europa is well beyond the outer limits of the Solar System's HZ, yet as a result of its orbital interactions with the other Galilean moons, it is believed to have a subsurface ocean of liquid water beneath its icy surface.

According to a 2023 paper by Jonathan Jernigan and colleagues, marine biological activity increases on planets with increasing obliquity and eccentricity. The authors suggest that planets with a high obliquity or eccentricity (or both) may be superhabitable, and that scientists should be keen to look for biosignatures on exoplanets with these orbital characteristics.

=== Mass and size ===
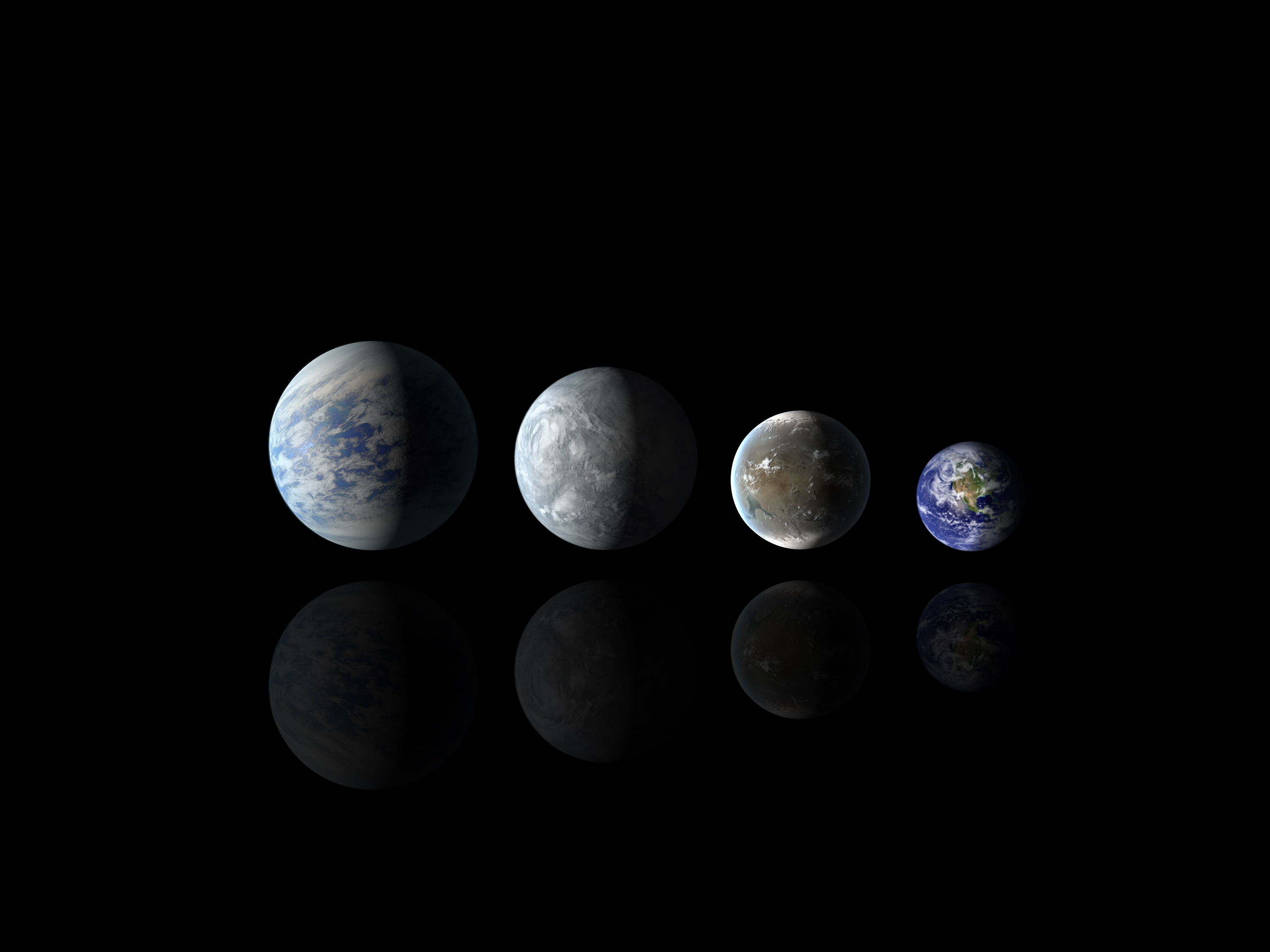
Kepler-62e, second from the left has a radius of 1.6 R_{🜨}. Earth is on the far right; scaled.

Assuming that a greater surface area would provide greater biodiversity, the size of a superhabitable world should generally be greater than 1 R_{🜨}, with the condition that its mass is not arbitrarily large. Studies of the mass-radius relationship indicate that there is a transition point between rocky planets and gaseous planets (i.e., mini-Neptunes) that occurs around 2 M_{🜨} or 1.7 R_{🜨}. Another study argues that there is a natural radius limit, set at 1.6 R_{🜨}, below which nearly all planets are terrestrial, composed primarily of rock-iron-water mixtures.

Heller and Armstrong argue that the optimal mass and radius of a superhabitable world can be determined by geological activity; the more massive a planetary body, the longer time it will continuously generate internal heat—a major contributing factor to plate tectonics. Too much mass, however, can slow plate tectonics by increasing the pressure of the mantle. It is believed that plate tectonics peak in bodies between 1 and 5 M_{🜨}, and from this perspective, a planet can be considered superhabitable up to around 2 M_{🜨}. Assuming this planet has a density similar to Earth's, its radius should be between 1.2 and 1.3 R_{🜨}.

=== Geology ===
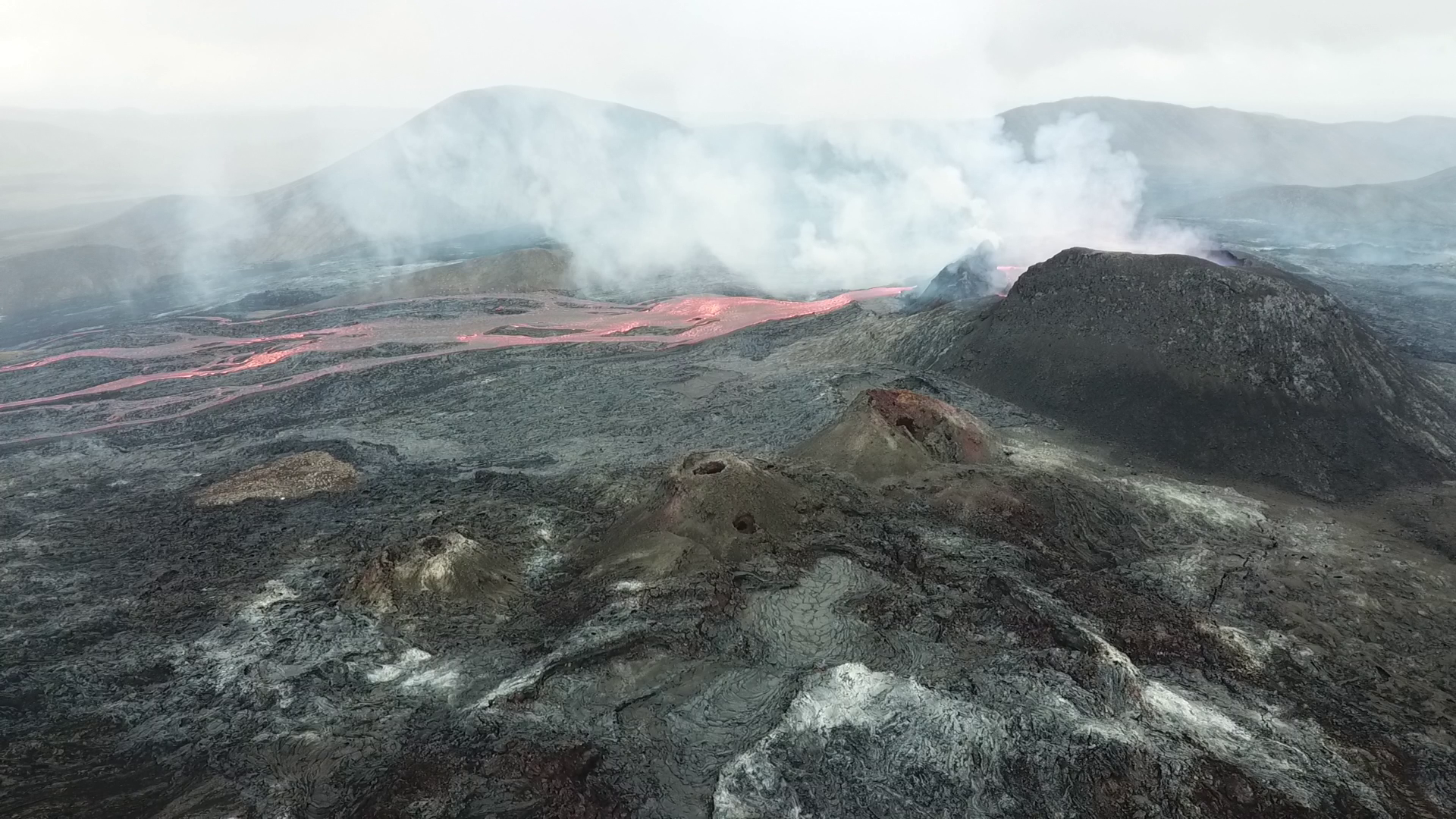
Volcanic activity from plate tectonics can release greenhouse gases like carbon dioxide into a planet's atmosphere, leading to climate warming. Pictured: Iceland's Fagradalsfjall volcano.

An important geological process is plate tectonics, which appears to be common in terrestrial planets with a significant rotation speed and an internal heat source. If large bodies of water are present on a planet, plate tectonics can maintain high levels of carbon dioxide (CO_{2}) in its atmosphere and increase the global surface temperature through the greenhouse effect. However, if tectonic activity is not significant enough to increase temperatures above the freezing point of water, the planet could experience a permanent ice age, unless the process is offset by another energy source like tidal heating or stellar irradiation. On the other hand, if the effects of any of these processes are too strong, the amount of greenhouse gases in the atmosphere could cause a runaway greenhouse effect by trapping heat and preventing adequate cooling.

The presence of a magnetic field is important for the long-term survivability of life on the surface of a planet or moon. A sufficiently strong magnetic field effectively shields a world's surface and atmosphere against ionizing radiation emanating from the interstellar medium and its host star. A planet can generate an intrinsic magnetic field through a dynamo that involves an internal heat source, an electrically conductive fluid like molten iron, and a significant rotation speed, while a moon could be extrinsically protected by its host planet's magnetic field. Less massive bodies and those that are tidally locked are likely to have a weak to non-existent magnetic field, which over time can result in the loss of a significant portion of its atmosphere by hydrodynamic escape and become a desert planet. If a planet's rotation is too slow, such as with Venus, then it cannot generate an Earth-like magnetic field. A more massive planet could overcome this problem by hosting multiple moons, which, through their combined gravitational effects, can boost the planet's magnetic field.

=== Surface features ===
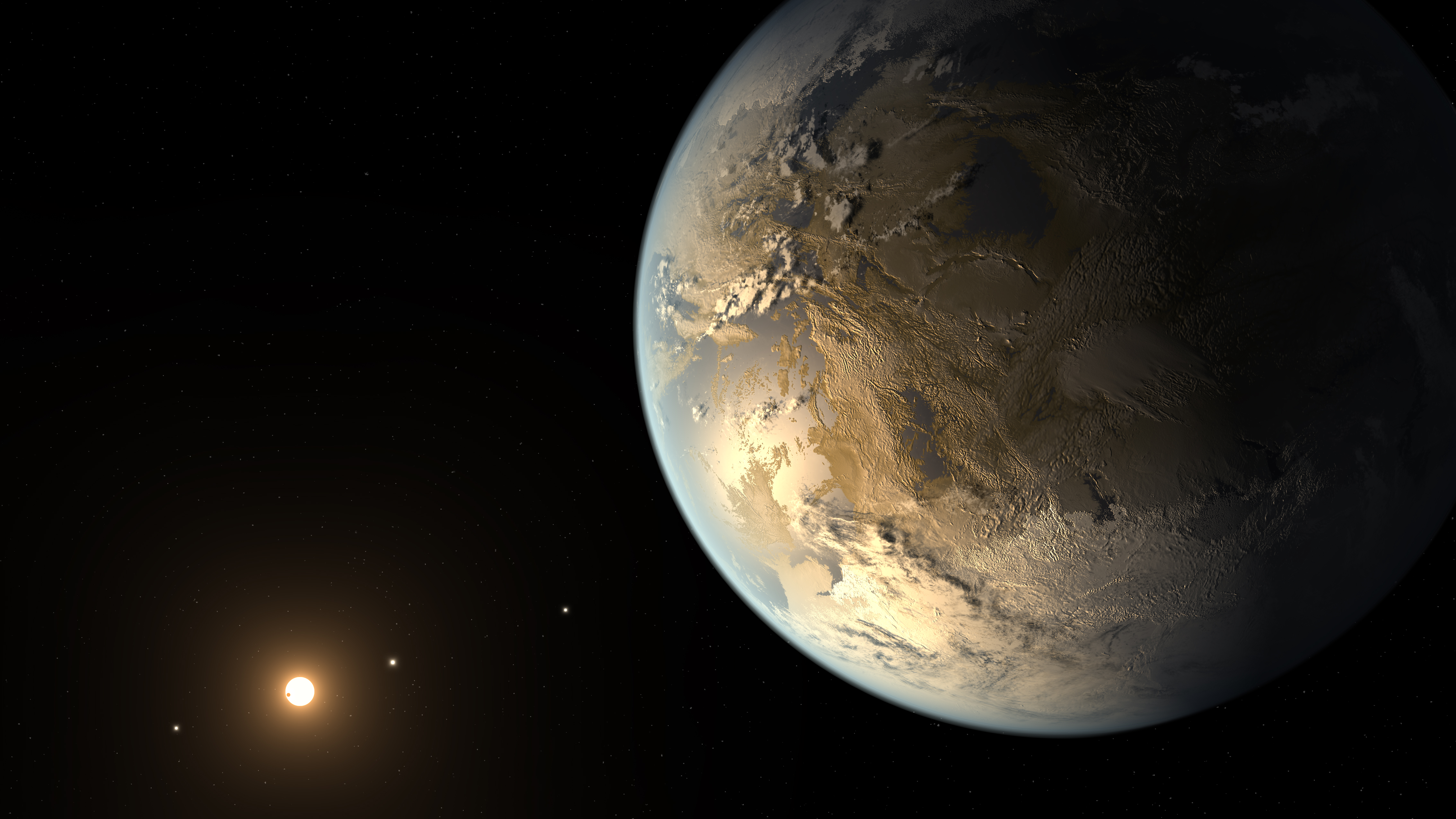
Artistic impression of Kepler-186f, a possible Earth analog. Some superhabitable planets could have a similar appearance and may not have important differences with Earth.

The appearance of a superhabitable world should be similar to the conditions found in the tropical climates of Earth. Due to the denser atmosphere and less temperature variation across its surface, such a world would lack any major ice sheets and have a higher concentration of clouds, while plant life would potentially cover more of the planet's surface and be visible from space.

When considering the differences in the peak wavelength of visible light for K-type stars and the lower stellar flux of the planet, surface vegetation may exhibit colors different than the typical green color found on Earth. Instead, vegetation on these worlds could have a red, orange, or even purple appearance.

An ocean that covers a large portion of a world's surface with fractionate continents and archipelagos could provide a stable environment across its surface. In addition, the greater surface gravity of a superhabitable world could reduce the average ocean depth and create shallow ocean basins, providing the optimal environment for marine life to thrive. For example, marine ecosystems found in the shallow areas of Earth's oceans and seas, given the amount of light and heat they receive, are observed to have greater biodiversity and are generally seen as being more comfortable for aquatic species. This has led researchers to speculate that shallow water environments on exoplanets should be similarly suitable for life.

=== Climate ===
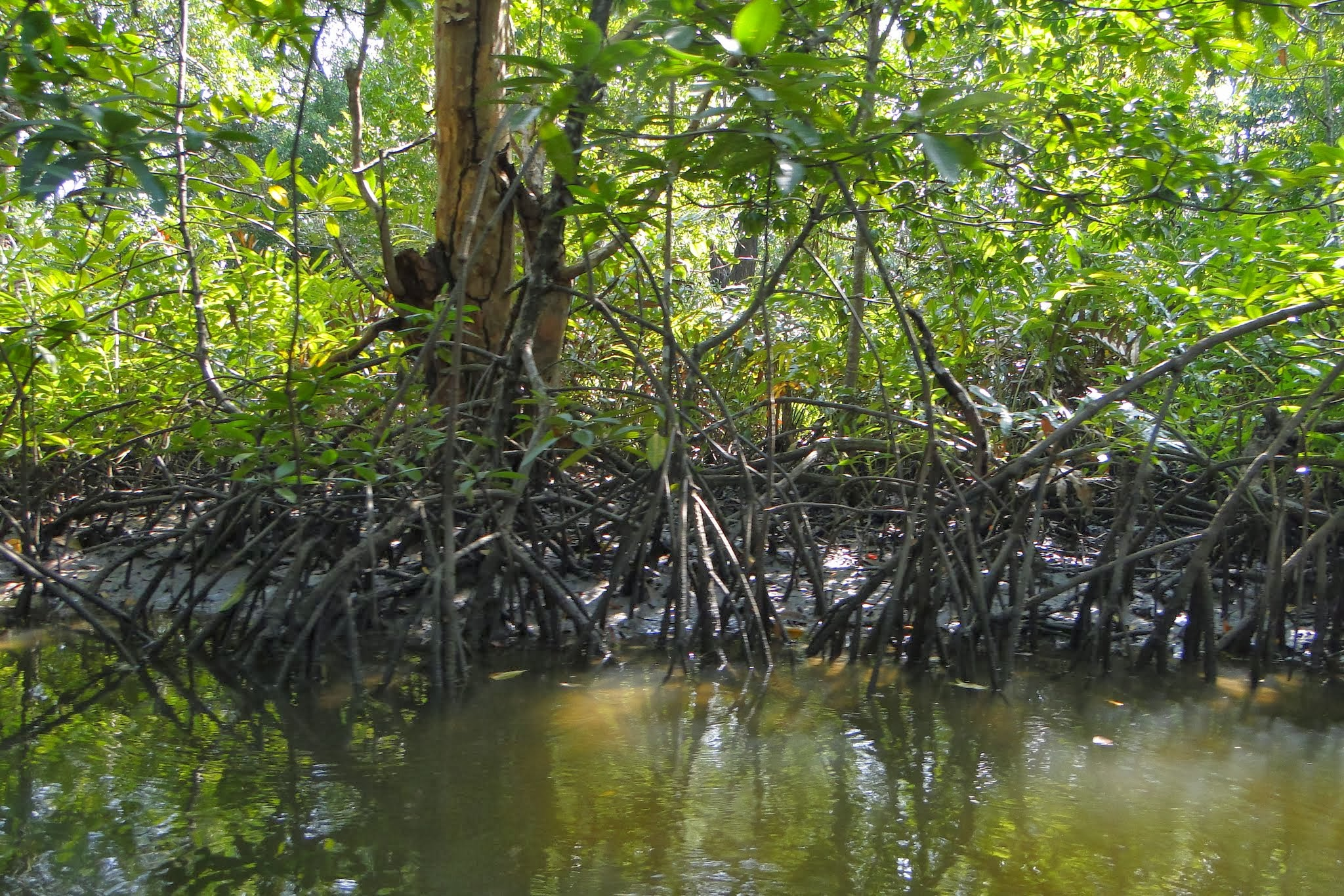
The climate of a warmer and wetter terrestrial exoplanet may resemble that of the tropical regions of Earth. In the picture, mangrove in Cambodia.

In general, the climate of a superhabitable planet would be warm, moist, and homogeneous, allowing life to extend across the surface without presenting large population differences. These characteristics are in contrast to those found on Earth, which has more variable and inhospitable regions that include frigid tundra and dry deserts. Deserts on superhabitable planets would be more limited in area and would likely support habitat-rich coastal environments.

The optimum surface temperature for Earth-like life is unknown, although it appears that on Earth, organism diversity has been greater in warmer periods. It is therefore possible that exoplanets with slightly higher average temperatures than that of Earth are more suitable for life. The denser atmosphere of a superhabitable planet would naturally provide a greater average temperature and less variability of the global climate. Ideally, the temperature should reach the optimal levels for plant life, which is 25 °C (77 °F). In addition, a large distributed ocean would have the ability to regulate a planet's surface temperature similar to Earth's ocean currents, and could allow it to maintain a moderate temperature within the habitable zone.

There are no solid arguments to explain if Earth's atmosphere has the optimal composition, but relative atmospheric oxygen levels is required to meet the high-energy demands of complex life (O_{2}). Therefore, it is hypothesized that oxygen abundance in the atmosphere is essential for complex life on other worlds.

== List of potentially superhabitable exoplanets ==
In September 2020, Dirk Schulze-Makuch and colleagues identified 24 contenders for superhabitable planets out of more than 4000 confirmed exoplanets and exoplanet candidates. The criteria included measurable factors like type of star, and the planet's age, mass, radius, and surface temperature. The authors also considered more hypothetical factors like the presence of abundant water, a large moon, and a geological recycling mechanism like plate tectonics.

Kepler-1126b (KOI-2162.01) and Kepler-69c (KOI-172.02) are the only objects in the list that have been confirmed as exoplanets. However, earlier research on Kepler-69c suggests that because its orbit lies near the inner edge of the HZ, its atmosphere could likely be in a runaway greenhouse state, which could heavily impact its prospects for habitability. The full list can be found below.

Object	Star type	Age (Gyr)	Mass (M_{⊕})	Radius (R_{⊕})	Surface temp. (K)	Period (days)	Distance (ly)	Refs/Notes
Earth	G2V	4.54	1.00	1.00	287	365.25	0	Reported for reference. Only planet known to support life.
KOI-5878.01	K3V-IV	8.0	—	1.88	522	211.54	10297	Not to be confused with KOI-4878.01.
KOI-5237.01	G8.5IV	7.0	—	1.84	429	380.39	9481	
KOI-7711.01	G9V-IV	7.5	—	1.31	413	302.78	4416	
Kepler-1126b	G1V	7.5	3.64	1.73	401	108.59	2114	Confirmed exoplanet.
Kepler-69c	G4V	7.0	3.57	1.71	356	242.47	2433	Confirmed exoplanet. Likely a super-Venus.
KOI-5248.01	G8.5V	4.3	—	1.35	355	179.25	3640	
KOI-5176.01	G8.5V	2.55	—	1.26	335	215.73	1611	
KOI-7235.01	G9V	6.5	—	1.15	329	299.67	3712	
KOI-7223.01	G3V	5.5	—	1.59	312	317.05	3389	
KOI-7621.01	G3V	0.82	—	1.86	308	275.07	365	
KOI-5135.01	K2.5V	5.9	—	2	304	314.77	4247	
KOI-5819.01	K0V	4.3	—	1.24	300	381.38	2701	
KOI-5554.01	G1.5V	6.5	—	0.96	299	362.22	701	
KOI-7894.01	G4V	5.0	—	1.62	289	347.98	3053	
KOI-456.04	G8V	7.0	—	1.91	287	378.42	3141	Orbits a sun-like star with an Earth-like orbital period.
KOI-5715.01	K3V	5.5	—	1.93	285	189.96	2965	One of the more promising candidates for superhabitability.
KOI-5276.01	K2.8V	6.0	—	2	280	220.72	3249	
KOI-8000.01	G8V	7.5	—	1.7	279	225.49	2952	
KOI-8242.01	G7V	5.5	—	1.36	270	331.56	1963	
KOI-5389.01	K1.5V	2.9	—	1.73	293	365.74	1018	
KOI-5130.01	K2.5V	6.0	—	1.9	305	370.06	3076	
KOI-5978.01	K3V	—	—	1.78	238	364.20	—	
KOI-8047.01	K3V	0.76	—	1.98	226	302.34	1924	

== See also ==
- List of potentially habitable exoplanets
- Planetary habitability
- Habitability of natural satellites
