= KOI-5715.01 =

Exoplanet candidate orbiting KOI-5715

Discovery
- Discovery date: 2014
- Detection method: Transit

Orbital characteristics
- Semi-major axis: 0.6066 AU
- Eccentricity: –
- Orbital period (sidereal): 189.961729±0.008865 d
- Inclination: 89.95°
- Star: KOI-5715

Physical characteristics
- Mean radius: 1.93+0.46 −0.13 R_{🜨}
- Temperature: T_{eq}: 260 K (−13 °C; 8 °F)

KOI-5715.01 is an exoplanet candidate that orbits the K-type dwarf star KOI-5715, located approximately 2,964 light-years from Earth in the constellation of Cygnus. It was identified in 2015 through an analysis of light curve data obtained by the Kepler space telescope. While the exoplanet is yet to be confirmed, preliminary data suggests that it is one of the more promising superhabitable planet candidates.

== Detection and status ==
In April 2015, KOI-5715.01 was included in a published catalog of candidate planets identified by the Kepler space telescope but was initially classified as a false positive. Following this, a 2016 study of transit-timing events from over 2,500 Kepler objects of interest (KOIs) re-identified KOI-5715.01 as a potential exoplanet. In September 2018, the NASA Exoplanet Archive re-evaluated the dispositions of hundreds of KOIs, employing a more varied vetting approach aimed at achieving the most accurate disposition for each KOI. Subsequently, KOI-5715.01 was reclassified as a candidate planet.

== Host star ==
The planet orbits the faint orange dwarf star (Note: K-type main sequence stars are sometimes called orange dwarfs.) KOI-5715, which has a spectral type of K3V. It is located approximately 2,964 light-years from Earth in the constellation of Cygnus. The effective temperature of the star is roughly 5123 K, relatively cooler than the Sun's temperature of 5780 K. KOI-5715 is also smaller than the Sun, possessing 74% of its mass and 86% of its radius.

== Habitability ==
In 2020, Dirk Schulze-Makuch and colleagues recognized KOI-5715.01 as one of the top contenders for planets they deemed "superhabitable," defined as a planet that offers more favorable conditions for life than what is found on Earth. It meets most of the criteria for superhabitable planets due to the characteristics of its host star and the planet's estimated age (~5.5 Ga) and surface temperature (~11.6 °C). Although its surface temperature is slightly colder than the Earth's average of 15 °C, it may still have superhabitable conditions if it is experiencing a comparatively stronger greenhouse effect.

== See also ==
- KOI-4878.01
- Kepler-160
- Kepler-69c
