= List of Kepler exoplanet candidates in the habitable zone =

Overview of potentially habitable unconfirmed expolanets

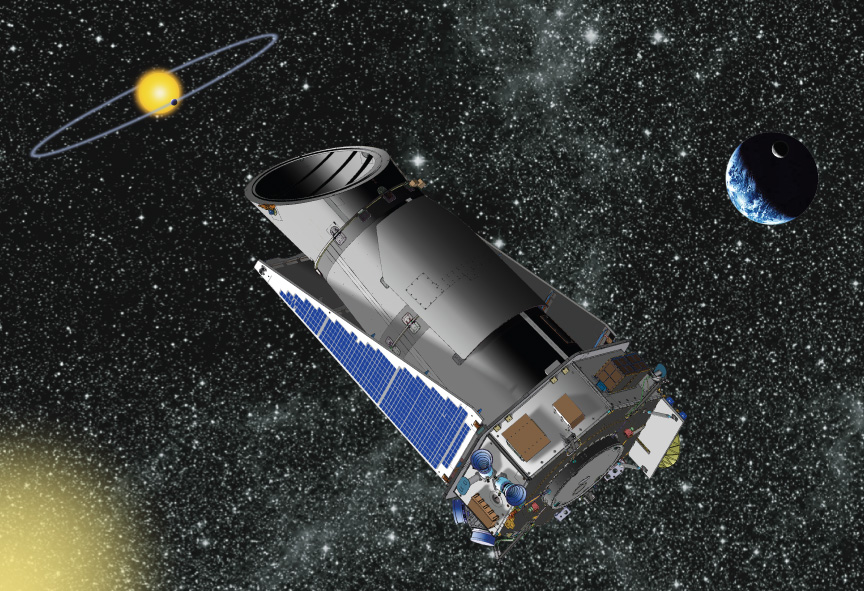
Artist's impression of Kepler, the telescope that detected these exoplanet candidates.

This is a list of unconfirmed exoplanets discovered or detected by the NASA Kepler mission (Kepler Candidates from the NASA Exoplanet Archive) that are potentially habitable. Those already confirmed are listed by their Kepler names in the list of potentially habitable exoplanets, and the data may differ when the planets are confirmed. Masses for a pure iron, rocky, and water composition are given for comparison purposes.

The planet candidate KOI-4878.01 could be one of the most Earth-like known planets in terms of size and stellar flux.

Name	Star	Mass (M_{🜨})	Radius (R_{🜨})	Flux (F_{🜨})	Teq (K)	Period (days)	Distance (ly)
KOI-4878.01	G	3.0 - 1.0 - 0.4	1.0	1.05	258	449.0	1075
KOI-456.04	G	3.5 - 13.5	1.91	0.896	248	378.4	3140
KOI-3456.02	F	4.9 - 1.5 - 0.7	1.2	0.92	249	486.1	1460
KOI-5737.01	G	7.7 - 2.2 - 1.0	1.3	0.99	254	376.2	1833
KOI-5806.01	G	6.3 - 1.9 - 0.8	1.3	1.29	271	313.8	970
KOI-5499.01	G	5.1 - 1.6 - 0.7	1.2	1.43	279	122.6	1965
KOI-2194.03	F	10.8 - 2.9 - 1.2	1.4	0.78	239	445.2	1914
KOI-6108.01	G	3.4 - 1.1 - 0.5	1.1	0.61	225	485.9	755
KOI-5938.01	F	21.7 - 5.0 - 2.1	1.7	1.03	257	545.2	1597
KOI-5087.01	G	15.5 - 3.9 - 1.6	1.6	0.71	234	651.1	1260
KOI-5948.01	G	5.8 - 1.7 - 0.8	1.2	0.58	222	398.5	1427
KOI-5176.01	G	6.3 - 1.9 - 0.8	1.3	1.72	292	215.7	1304
KOI-5949.01	F	44.2 - 8.1 - 3.2	1.9	0.92	249	559.8	1873
KOI-5506.01	F	18.6 - 4.5 - 1.9	1.6	0.66	230	641.6	2638
KOI-6239.01	G	30.6 - 6.4 - 2.6	1.8	0.73	236	406.5	1743
KOI-5888.01	G	38.5 - 7.4 - 3.0	1.8	1.32	273	190.9	2875
KOI-5068.01	F	16.5 - 4.1 - 1.7	1.6	1.69	290	385.3	1740
KOI-5541.01	G	N/A - 11.2 - 4.3	2.0	0.93	250	339.6	2550
KOI-5959.01	G	27.8 - 6.0 - 2.4	1.7	1.55	284	251.5	2451
KOI-5236.01	F	64.4 - 9.9 - 3.8	2.0	0.79	240	550.9	1605
KOI-5819.01	K	5.9 - 1.8 - 0.8	1.2	0.48	212	381.4	1459
KOI-5413.01	G	70.1 - 10.3 - 4.0	2.0	0.74	236	428.4	1882
KOI-5202.01	F	37.2 - 7.3 - 2.9	1.8	0.63	227	535.9	2865
KOI-1871.01	K	N/A - 13.8 - 5.2	2.1	1.21	267	92.7	1169
KOI-5653.01	K	N/A - 10.7 - 4.1	2.0	0.68	231	188.7	1895
KOI-5237.01	G	38.5 - 7.4 - 3.0	1.8	0.60	224	380.4	2761
KOI-6151.01	G	8.7 - 2.5 - 1.1	1.4	0.47	211	431.8	1731
KOI-5545.01	G	3.5 - 1.1 - 0.5	1.1	0.43	206	541.0	1379
KOI-5592.01	F	N/A - 18.5 - 6.7	2.3	0.81	241	482.5	3587
KOI-4986.01	G	12.5 - 3.3 - 1.4	1.5	0.47	211	444.0	2112
KOI-5796.01	F	N/A - 18.5 - 6.7	2.3	0.78	239	495.9	3110
KOI-5613.01	G	N/A - 22.7 - 7.9	2.4	0.94	251	346.4	3972
KOI-5810.01	G	N/A - 16.8 - 6.1	2.2	1.41	278	425.6	2336
KOI-5835.01	F	N/A - 24.0 - 8.3	2.4	0.91	249	475.0	3791
KOI-5290.01	G	N/A - 11.6 - 4.4	2.1	0.61	225	435.5	3793
KOI-4583.01	G	N/A - 11.4 - 4.4	2.0	0.61	225	330.9	3127
KOI-5869.01	K	N/A - 23.2 - 8.1	2.4	1.21	267	114.4	2007
KOI-3401.02	G	N/A - 15.2 - 5.6	2.2	1.52	283	326.7	2697
KOI-5657.01	F	70.1 - 10.3 - 4.0	2.0	1.74	293	284.7	2745
KOI-4333.01	F	N/A - 14.7 - 5.5	2.2	1.61	287	309.3	2583
KOI-5874.01	G	N/A - 15.5 - 5.7	2.2	1.65	289	287.3	1770
KOI-5889.01	F	N/A - 23.2 - 8.1	2.4	1.45	279	374.4	5030
KOI-5135.01	G	70.1 - 10.3 - 4.0	2.0	0.53	217	314.8	2577
KOI-5556.01	G	41.2 - 7.7 - 3.1	1.9	0.46	210	632.0	1459
KOI-5798.01	G	N/A - 10.9 - 4.2	2.0	0.48	212	318.3	2632
KOI-5196.01	F	N/A - 22.7 - 7.9	2.4	1.84	297	392.5	1424
KOI-5924.01	G	N/A - 26.4 - 9.0	2.5	0.54	218	291.3	2604
KOI-3028.02	G	N/A - 12.8 - 4.8	2.1	0.45	208	458.2	3759
KOI-5398.01	G	N/A - 12.6 - 4.8	2.1	0.43	206	551.2	2154
KOI-4902.01	K	31.6 - 6.5 - 2.6	1.8	0.35	196	409.4	2012
KOI-5749.01	K	N/A - 18.8 - 6.8	2.3	0.41	204	282.0	1883
KOI-4961.01	K	N/A - 11.2 - 4.3	2.0	0.36	198	349.0	2048
KOI-5829.01	G	61.9 - 9.7 - 3.8	2.0	0.35	196	583.9	2412
KOI-2770.01	K	N/A - 18.8 - 6.8	2.3	0.39	201	205.4	1511
KOI-5570.01	G	N/A - 17.8 - 6.4	2.3	0.35	196	574.7	2236
KOI-5649.01	G	N/A - 19.2 - 6.9	2.3	0.29	187	426.9	1861
KOI-6425.01	G	18.7 - 4.5 - 1.9	1.6	0.68	231	521.1	2183
KOI-6676.01	F	32.6 - 6.7 - 2.7	1.8	1.18	266	439.2	2495
KOI-7040.01	F	14.8 - 3.8 - 1.6	1.5	0.48	212	502.2	2483
KOI-7179.01	G	5.1 - 1.6 - 0.7	1.2	1.3	272.1	407.1	1807
KOI-7223.01	G	21.7 - 5.0 - 2.1	1.7	0.57	221.5	317	1705
KOI-7235.01	G	5.8 - 1.8 - 0.8	1.2	0.75	237.4	299.7	2006
KOI-7345.01	F	N/A - 22.3 - 7.8	2.4	1.2	266	377.5	3748
KOI-7470.01	G	N/A - 10.5 - 4.1	2.0	0.60	225	392.5	1483
KOI-7554.01	F	N/A - 12.1 - 4.6	2.1	1.13	263	482.6	3361
KOI-7587.01	G	N/A - 18.6 - 6.7	2.3	1.03	256.8	366	679
EPIC 203823381.01	M	0.8 - 0.3 - 0.1	0.7	0.40	203	8.3	10
KOI-2124.01	K	-	1	-	297	42	-
KOI-7617.01	M	-	0.63	-	342	13	1177.2
KOI-7923.01	K	0.89	0.97	0.44	208	395	679.7
KOI-4427.01	M	38.5 - 7.4 - 3.0	1.8	0.24	179	147.7	782
KOI-7591.01	K	7.2 - 2.1 - 0.9	1.3	0.33	193	328.3	1582
KOI-6343.01	F	47.4 - 8.4 - 3.3	1.9	0.61	225	569.5	2910
KOI-5276.01	K	? - 15.2 - 5.6	2.2	0.72	235	220.7	2728
KOI-6734.01	G	? - 13.1 - 4.9	2.1	0.50	214	498.3	3708
KOI-7136.01	G	? - 17.4 - 6.3	2.3	0.52	217	441.2	3654

== See also ==
- List of potentially habitable exoplanets
