= KOI-4878.01 =

Unconfirmed potentially habitable exoplanet

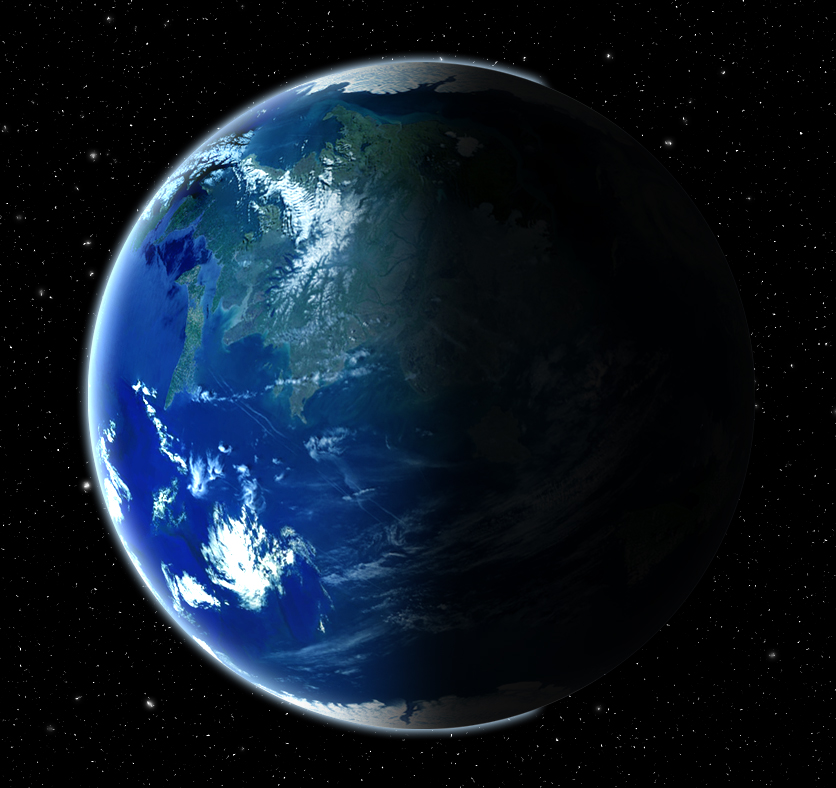
- An artist's impression of KOI-4878.01

Discovery
- Discovery site: Kepler space telescope
- Discovery date: 2015
- Detection method: Transit

Orbital characteristics
- Semi-major axis: 1.1392+0.0265 −0.0268 AU
- Eccentricity: 0
- Orbital period (sidereal): 449.015±0.021 days
- Inclination: 89.95 °
- Star: KOI-4878

Physical characteristics
- Mean radius: 1.02+0.04 −0.13 R_{🜨}
- Temperature: 257 K (−16 °C; 3 °F)

KOI-4878.01 is an exoplanet candidate that orbits the G-type main-sequence star KOI-4878. It is 1,120 light-years (344 pc) distant from Earth. The features of the planet are very similar to that of Earth, and if it is confirmed, it would be one of the most Earth-like planets found. The orbital period of the exoplanet is around 449 days. It is located within the habitable zone of its parent star – a region where water can exist at liquid state.

== Host star ==
KOI-4878 is a G-type main-sequence star, more precisely of spectral class G4V. It has an apparent magnitude of 12.37 and is located in the constellation of Draco. The star has a mass of 1.009±0.129 M_{☉}, a radius of 1.131±0.059 R_{☉} and an effective temperature of 5674±125 K. Its age is estimated at 6.1±2.5 billion years, older than the Solar System.

== Exoplanet detection ==
An analysis of the Kepler space telescope's data from its first to the twelve quarter revealed three possible transit events equally spaced in time. A post-analysis in the Sixteen quarter showed that the events happened within a period of 449 days, they had a duration of 12 and half hours and a transit depth of 94 ppm.

== Characteristics ==
=== Size, mass, temperature ===
KOI-4878.01 has a slightly larger radius than the Earth: 1.02 Earth radii. Its mass has not been measured, but it is estimated to be somewhere between 0.4 - 3.0 Earth masses; most likely around 0.99 Earth masses. The planet has an equilibrium temperature of 257 K (−16 °C; 3 °F). For reference, the equilibrium temperature of the Earth is 255 K (−18 °C; −1 °F).

== Habitability ==
The estimated features of the planet are similar to an Earth analog. It completes an orbit around its host star every 449 Earth days. Based on this, KOI-4878.01 should be in the habitable zone of the star.

The age of KOI-4878, and consequently the age of KOI-4878.01, is 6.1±2.5 billion years, suggesting that it had more time for life to evolve than Earth did. Because of this, some astronomers speculate that it may be more suitable for intelligent life than Earth.

== See also ==
- List of potentially habitable exoplanets
- Superhabitable world
- KOI-5715.01
- Kepler-160
- Kepler-69c
