= Kinetotroph =

Hypothetic organism that uses kinetic energy

A kinetotroph or kinetic harvester is a hypothetical organism that would use kinetic energy to produce complex molecules like adenosine triphosphate (ATP). Kinetotrophs could obtain their energy from numerous sources like wind, tides, or currents; this would allow them to inhabit locations with minimal light for photosynthesis. Kinetotrophs could descend from chemotrophs, and have been hypothesized to take the form of sedentary ciliates and reed-like organisms.

There are no known kinetotrophs on Earth, likely because the process is less efficient than other sources of energy like light or chemicals. However, similar transducer systems have been observed in some organisms. For example, some fish possess a lateral line organ, which uses cilia to turn the movement of fluid into electric signals.

== Mechanisms ==
The theoretical mechanics that would allow kinetotrophism vary widely. One pathway proposed by Dirk Schulze-Makuch and Louis N. Irwin involves lever-like proteins that would be moved by the flow of fluid. When inside a protein channel with cilia-like proteins that could act as channel guards, the levers could allow specific molecules into or out of the cell. Harnessing the Gibbs–Donnan effect, sodium ions could be made to enter the cell and fuel a hydrogen transporter similar to those in mitochondria, thus allowing for energy-storing molecules like ATP to be synthesized. This mechanism would act like a battery; thus, only enough time and a flow of fluid in the range of millimetres per second would be required for the synthesizing of complex molecules.

Another mechanism to derive energy from kinetics would be a spring-like structure. Fluid currents or tides could place pressure on cilia structures, bending them and creating tensile energy. When the pressure subsides, that tension would be released and could create usable energy.

== Habitat ==
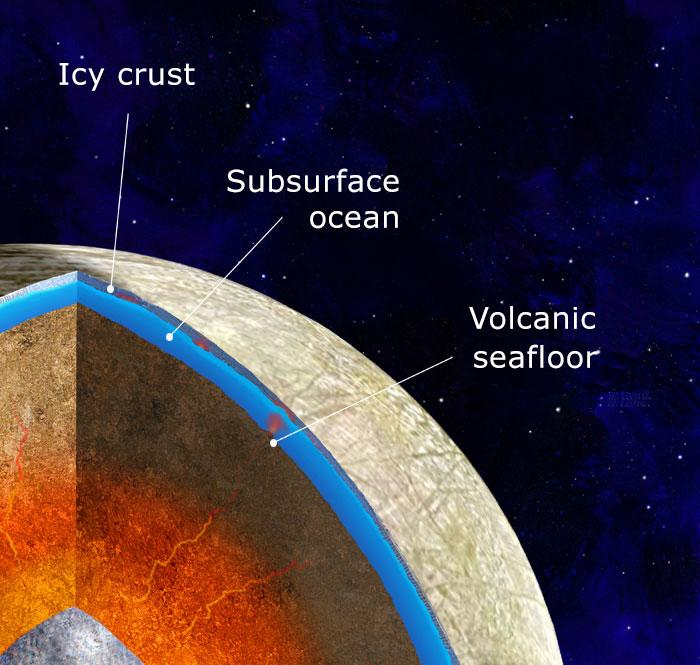
Kinetotrophs could thrive under the Europan ice sheet or on the moon's volcanic seafloor.

It has been proposed that kinetotrophs could exist underneath the ice sheet of the Jovian moon Europa. These organisms might attach to the underside of the ice sheet, or to substrates on the ocean floor. The kinetic energy these organisms would harness could be provided by convection cells, where currents are created by the varying temperatures of fluid throughout the water column.
