= 69C =

69C or 69c may refer to:

- Interstate 69C, a freeway in Texas
- Kepler-69c, a planet orbiting Kepler-69
