= Kepler-69 =

Star in the constellation Cygnus

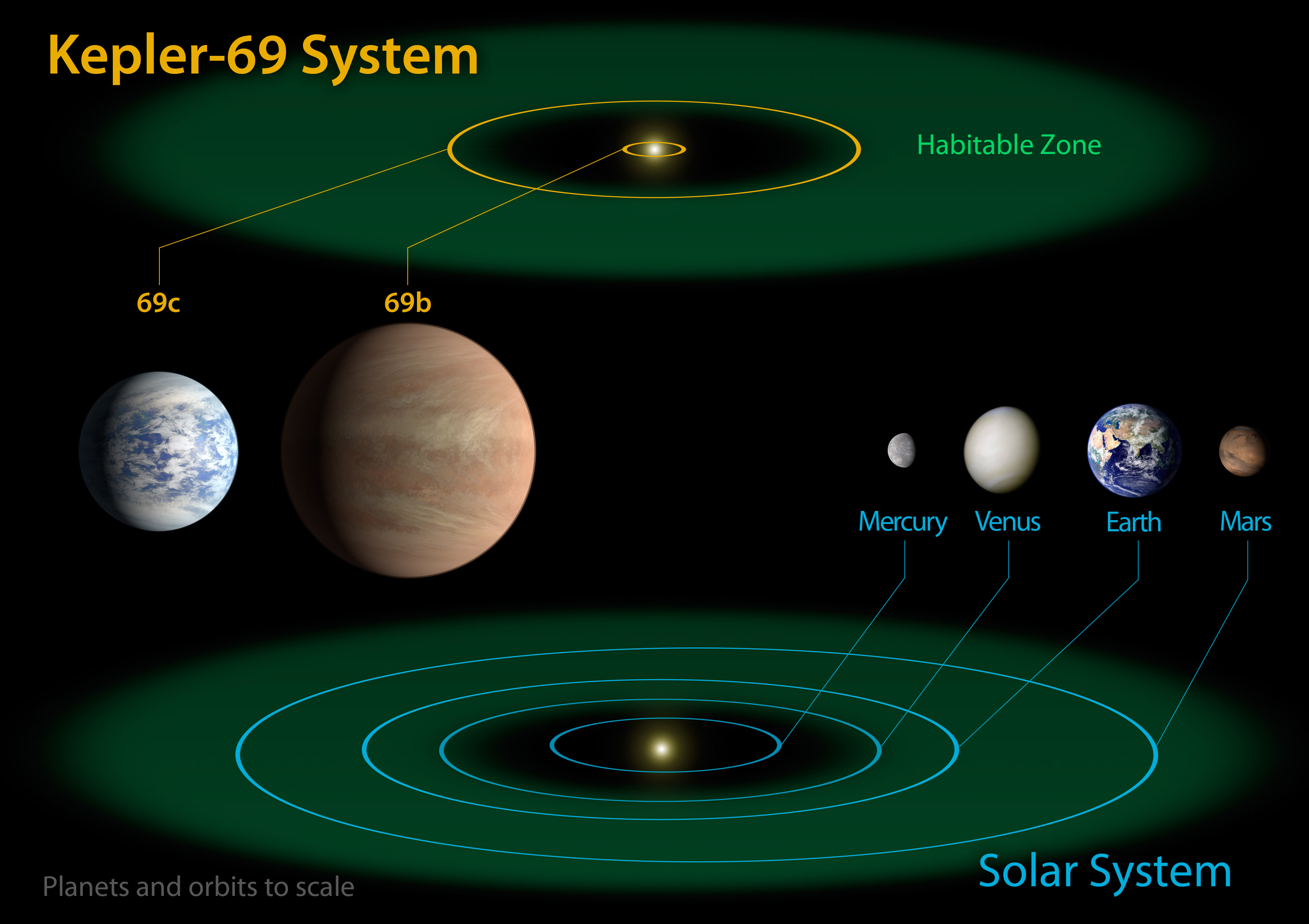
- Comparison of the Kepler-69 System and the Solar System underneath. Credit: NASA Ames/JPL-Caltech

Observation data Epoch J2000 Equinox ICRS
- Constellation: Cygnus
- Right ascension: 19^{h} 33^{m} 02.6305^{s}
- Declination: +44° 52′ 08.020″
- Apparent magnitude (V): 13.7

Characteristics
- Evolutionary stage: Main sequence
- Spectral type: G4V

Astrometry
Radial velocity (R_{v})	−38.7±0.1 km/s
Proper motion (μ)	RA: −9.713(16) mas/yr Dec.: −6.683(15) mas/yr
Parallax (π)	1.3650±0.0122 mas
Distance	2,390 ± 20 ly (733 ± 7 pc)

Details
Mass	0.88+0.04 −0.03 M_{☉}
Radius	1.2±0.05 R_{☉}
Luminosity	1.57 L_{☉}
Surface gravity (log g)	4.37±0.11 cgs
Temperature	5,784±36 K
Metallicity [Fe/H]	−0.29±0.15 dex
Age	12.7+2.4 −1.3 Gyr

Other designations
- KIC 8692861, KOI-172

Database references
SIMBAD	data

Kepler-69 (KOI-172, 2MASS J19330262+4452080, KIC 8692861) is a G-type main-sequence star similar to the Sun in the constellation Cygnus, located about 2,390 ly (730 pc) from Earth. On April 18, 2013 it was announced that the star has two planets. Although initial estimates indicated that the terrestrial planet Kepler-69c might be within the star's habitable zone, further analysis showed that the planet very likely is interior to the habitable zone and is far more analogous to Venus than to Earth and thus completely inhospitable.

== Nomenclature and history ==
Prior to Kepler observation, Kepler-69 had the 2MASS catalogue number 2MASS J19330262+4452080. In the Kepler Input Catalog it has the designation of KIC 8692861, and when it was found to have transiting planet candidates it was given the Kepler object of interest number of KOI-172.

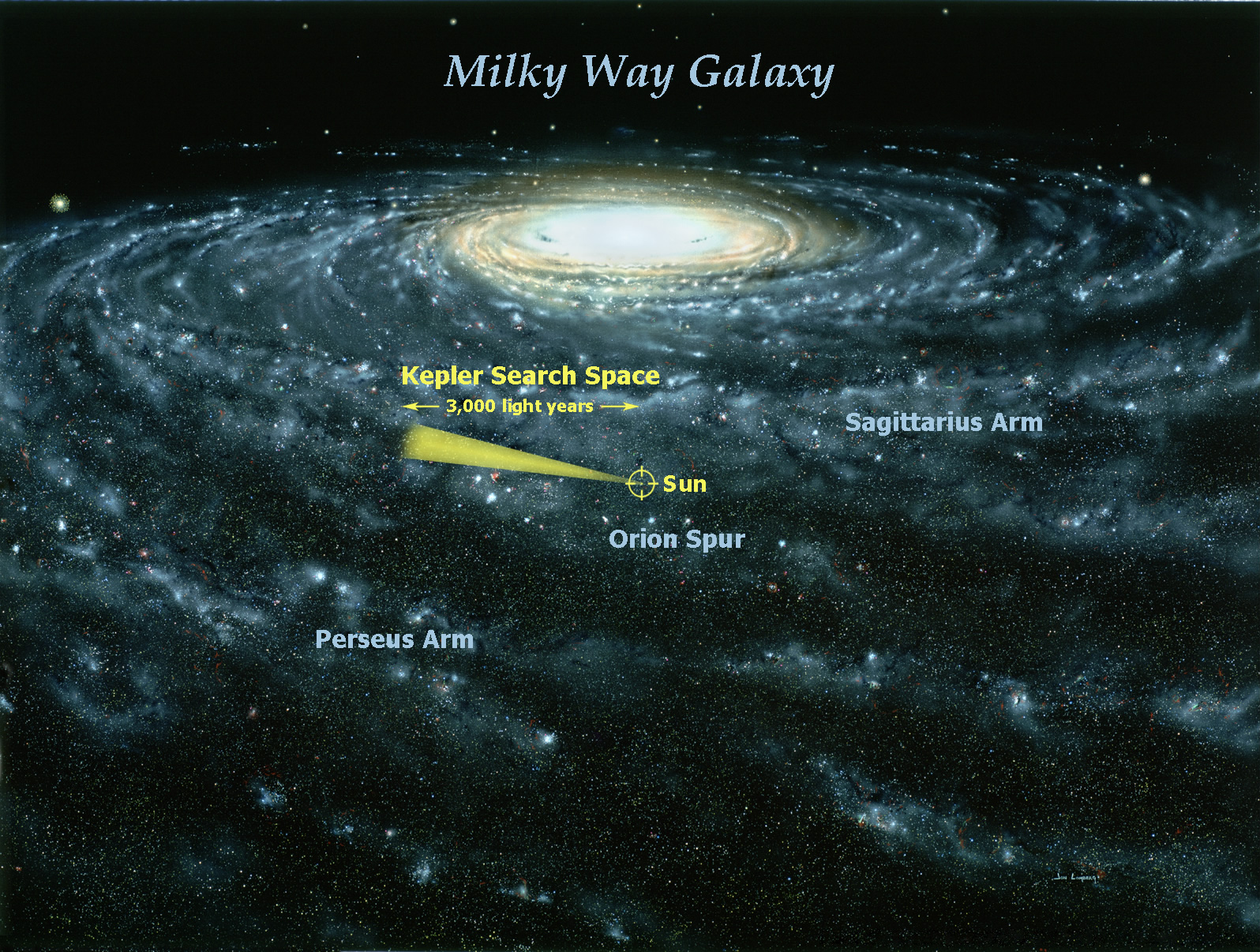
The Kepler Space Telescope search volume, in the context of the Milky Way.

The star's planets were discovered by NASA's Kepler Mission, a mission tasked with discovering planets in transit around their stars. The transit method that Kepler uses involves detecting dips in brightness in stars. These dips in brightness can be interpreted as planets whose orbits move in front of their stars from the perspective of Earth. The name Kepler-69 derives directly from the fact that the star is the catalogued 69th star discovered by Kepler to have confirmed planets.

The designations b, c derive from the order of discovery. The designation of b is given to the first planet orbiting a given star, followed by the other lowercase letters of the alphabet. In the case of Kepler-69, all of the known planets in the system were discovered at one time, so b is applied to the closest planet to the star and c to the farthest.

== Stellar characteristics ==
Kepler-69 is a G4 star that is approximately 81% the mass of and 93% the radius of the Sun. It has a surface temperature of 5638 ± 168 K and is 9.8 billion years old. In comparison, the Sun has a surface temperature of 5778 K and is 4.6 billion years old.

The star's apparent magnitude, or how bright it appears from Earth's perspective, is 13.7. Therefore, Kepler-69 is too dim to be seen with the naked eye.

== Planetary system ==
Kepler-69 has two known planets orbiting around it. Kepler-69b is a hot super-Earth-sized exoplanet. Kepler-69c is a super-Earth-sized exoplanet, about 2.2 times larger than Earth. It receives a similar amount of flux from its star as Venus does from the Sun, and is thus a likely candidate for a super-Venus. Newer measurements suggest higher planetary radii than previous estimates: 2.80 and 2.17 R_{🜨} for Kepler 69 b and c respectively, in contrast with the earlier estimate from Barclay et al. (2013): 2.24 and 1.71 R_{🜨}.

The Kepler-69 planetary system (Note: Mass: Kane et al. (2013) Radii:Berger et al. (2020) Semi-major axes: Berger et al. (2020) Periods:Barclay et al. (2013) Eccentricities:Barclay et al. (2013) Inclinations: Barclay et al. (2013))
Companion (in order from star)	Mass	Semimajor axis (AU)	Orbital period (days)	Eccentricity	Inclination (°)	Radius
b	—	0.1105+0.0027 −0.0026	13.722341+0.000035 −0.000036	0.16+0.17 −0.0010	89.62+0.26 −0.45	2.80+0.09 −0.07 R_{🜨}
c	2.14 M_{🜨}	0.7494+0.0184 −0.0173	242.4613+0.0059 −0.0064	0.14+0.18 −0.10	85.85+0.03 −0.08	2.17+0.02 −0.08 R_{🜨}

Kepler-69c - a Venus-like exoplanet orbiting a Sun-like star

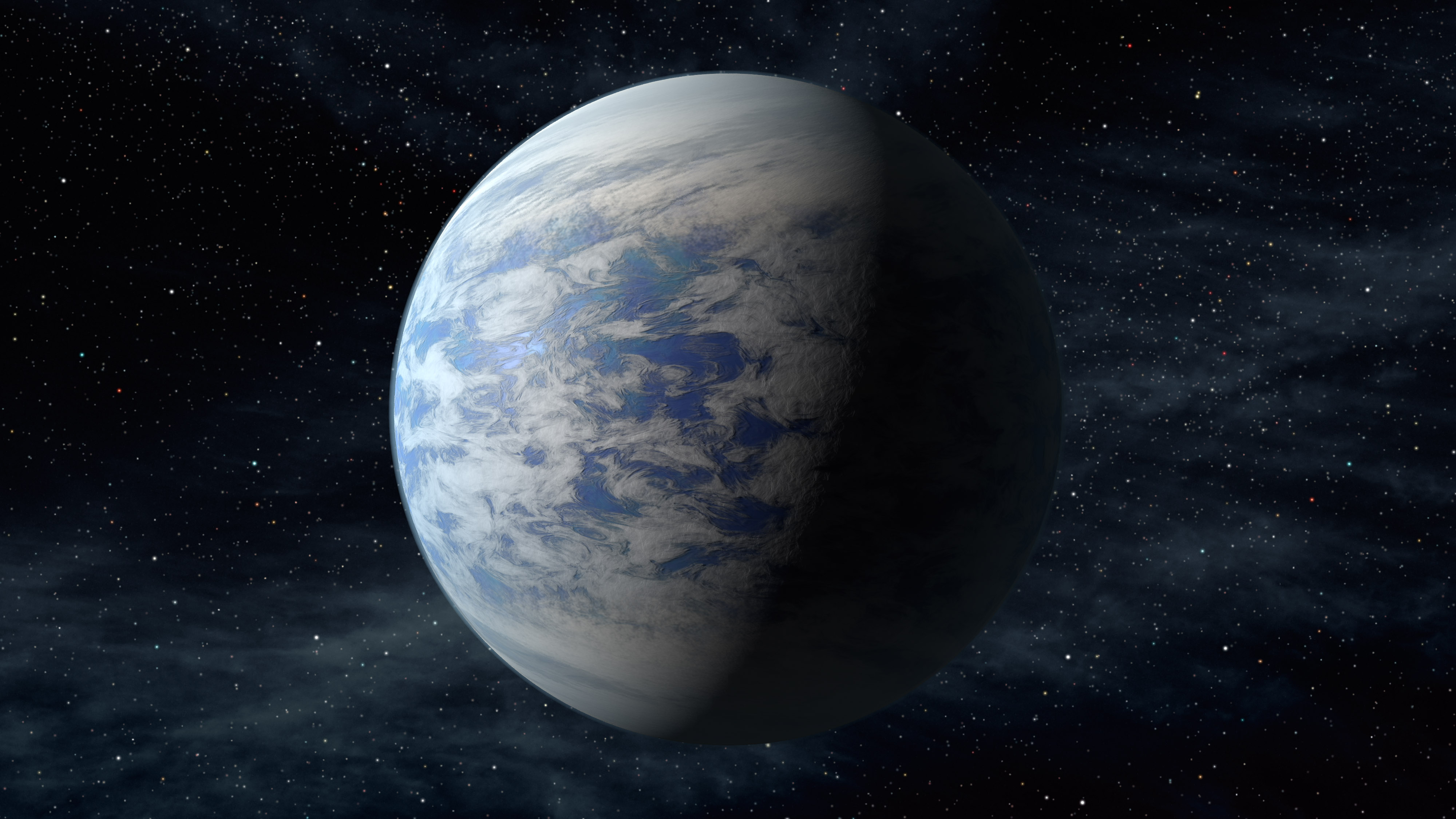
Kepler-69c, a Super-Earth-size exoplanet orbiting Kepler-69, a star like the Sun.

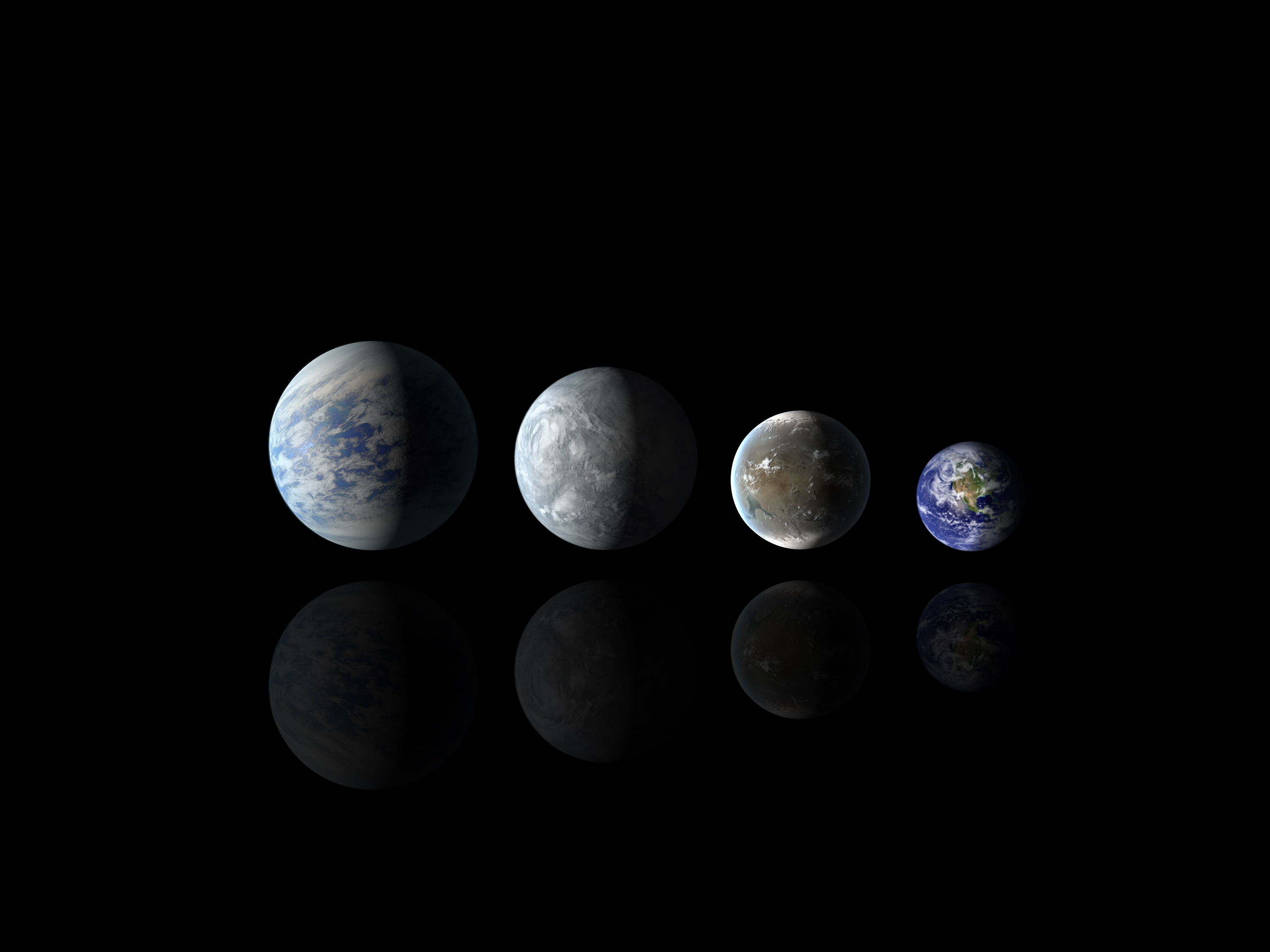
Comparison of Planet Sizes - Kepler-69c, Kepler-62e, Kepler-62f, and Earth.

== See also ==
- List of potentially habitable exoplanets
- Kepler-70
