= Dirk Schulze-Makuch =

Astrobiologist

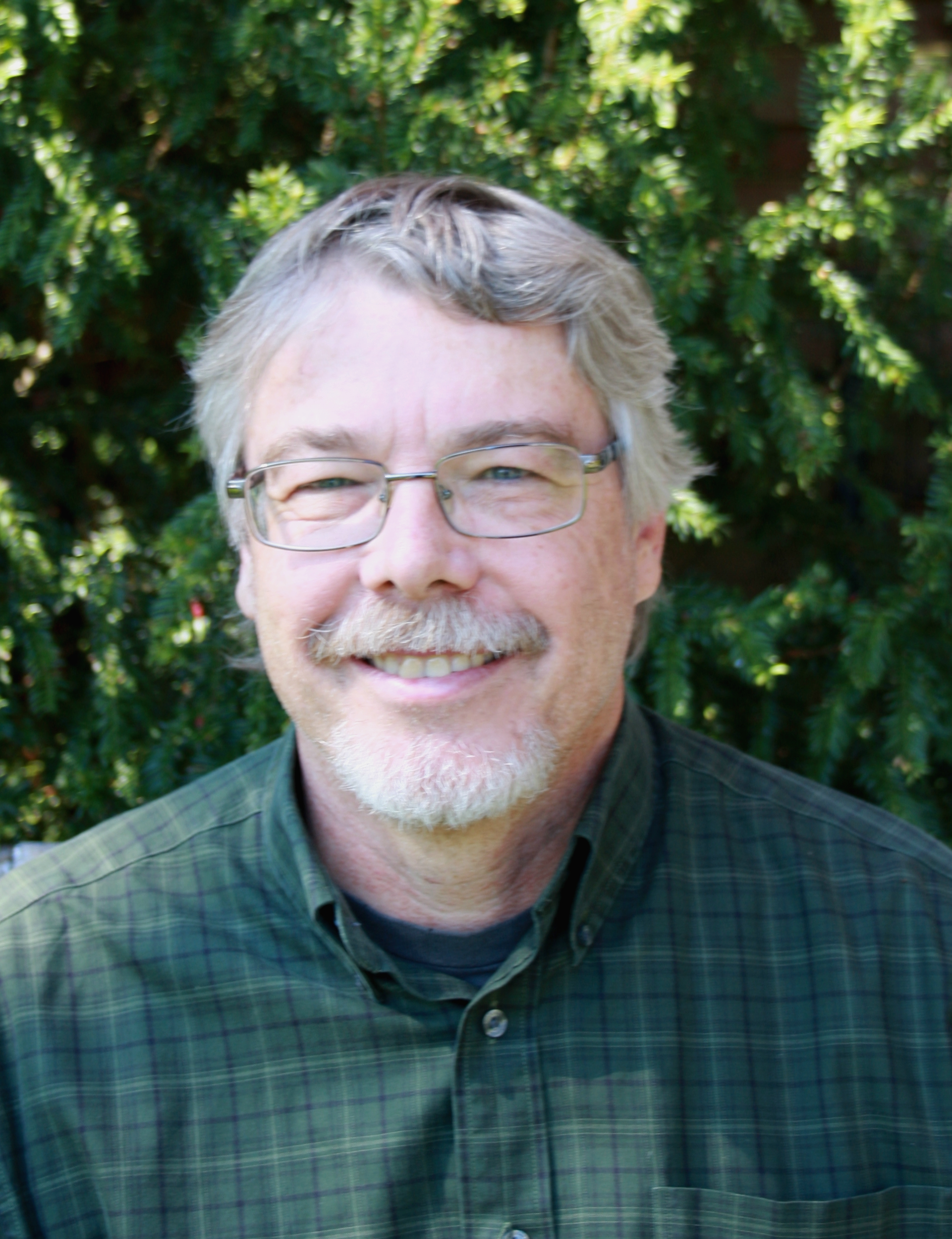
- Dirk Schulze-Makuch in May 2020
- Born: 29 January 1964 (age 62); Giessen, Germany
- Education: Justus Liebig University, Giessen
- Known for: Life in the Universe (with L. N. Irwin) (2018)
- Awards: Friedrich-Wilhelm Bessel Award (2010)
- Scientific career
- Fields: Astrobiology; Geology
- Workplaces: Technische Universität Berlin; German Aerospace Centre; Washington State University; University of Texas at El Paso; University of Wisconsin; Justus Liebig University

Dirk Schulze-Makuch (born 1964) is a professor at the Center for Astronomy and Astrophysics at Technische Universität Berlin, Germany and adjunct professor at the School of Earth and Environmental Sciences Washington State University, Pullman, Washington. He is best known for his publications on extraterrestrial life, being coauthor of five books on the topic: The Cosmic Zoo: Complex Life on Many Worlds (2017), A One Way Mission to Mars: Colonizing the Red Planet (2011), We Are Not Alone: Why We Have Already Found Extraterrestrial Life (2010), Cosmic Biology: How Life could Evolve on Other Worlds (2010), and Life in the Universe: Expectations and Constraints (2004, 2008, 2018). In 2012 he published with David Darling Megacatastrophes! Nine Strange Ways the World Could End. In 2013 he published the second edition of his science fiction novel Alien Encounter. Together with Paul Davies he proposed in 2010 exploration of Mars by a one-way trip to the planet.

== Education and career ==
His upbringing was in Giessen, Germany, where he received his Diplom-Degree (M.S.) in Geology from Justus Liebig University in 1991. In 1996 he obtained his Ph.D. in Geosciences from the University of Wisconsin-Milwaukee. After having worked as Senior Project Hydrogeologist at Envirogen, a Princeton-based research and consulting firm, for which he investigated subsurface hydrocarbon spills, he became in 1997 adjunct professor at the University of Wisconsin-La Crosse. In 1998 he joined the University of Texas at El Paso as assistant professor, investigating microbe and chemical transport in groundwater, and microbial interaction in a planetary environment. From there he joined Washington State University in 2004: first as associate professor, since 2010 as professor at the School of Earth and Environmental Sciences, with focus on astrobiology and planetary habitability. Since 2013 he is a professor at Technische Universität Berlin (Germany) and led as Principal Investigator the European Union – funded ERC Advanced Grant project on the “Habitability of Martian Environments” from 2013 to 2019. In 2019 he has been awarded an ERC Proof of Concept Grant. Since 2016 he is president of the German Astrobiology Society.

== Scientific research ==
Schulze-Makuch's research interests and publications range from life beyond Earth, including planetary protection, hydrobiology, archeology, to cancer. To the viewer he may be best known for his work in astrobiology in particular the possible existence of life on Venus, Mars, Titan, Europa, and Io . With Ian Crawford he proposes that microbial life may have existed temporarily on Earth´s Moon, at a time of major volcanic outgassing about 3.5 billion years ago. In The Cosmic Zoo: Complex Life on Many Worlds (with William Bains) he advances the idea that complex life might be common, but technologically advanced life rare, as this transition has only been achieved once in the natural history of Earth despite many different intelligent species existing on our planet. His book Life in the Universe (with L. N. Irwin) and his studies consider alternative physiologies for extraterrestrial life. In his more recent work Dirk Schulze-Makuch suggests that the Viking experiments might have accidentally killed indigenous Martian life by applying too much water to the soil and that the search for life on Mars should give more attention to hygroscopic salts as a potential habitat. Also, he proposes in a paper with Ian Crawford that the solution to the Fermi Paradox may either be the Zoo Hypothesis (the aliens do not interfere and consider us as a nature preserve or as a developing civilization, not to be meddled with akin to the Prime Directive in Star Trek) or that – as a technologically advanced species – we are (nearly) alone in the Universe.

== Patents ==
Removal of Biological Pathogens Using Surfactant Modified Zeolite. Patent No. US 7,311,839 B2. Date of patent: dec. 25, 2007.

Optical Instrument to Determine Bioparticles in a Fluid Medium (Using a Smartphone) Patent No. Germany 10 2021 105 030, Date of Patent 15 June 2022.

== Awards ==
Friedrich-Wilhelm Bessel Award (2010) by the Alexander von Humboldt Foundation.

== Media activity ==
The work of Schulze-Makuch has received much attention. It has been the subject of TV programs on the BBC, the National Geographic and the Discovery Channel, and of numerous articles in magazines such as New Scientist, The Guardian and Der Spiegel.

Blog: Air&Space Magazine: Life beyond Earth and since 2022 regularly on BigThink.com and his personal webpage.

== Works ==
=== Academic books ===
- Life in the Universe: Expectations and Constraints (with L.N. Irwin) (3rd ed.) (2018) ISBN 978-3-319976570
- Life in the Universe: Expectations and Constraints (with L.N. Irwin) (2nd ed.) (2008) ISBN 978-3-540-76816-6
- Life in the Universe: Expectations and Constraints (with L.N. Irwin) (2004) ISBN 978-3-540-76816-6

=== Popular science books ===
- The Cosmic Zoo (2017) ISBN 3-319-62044-4 ISBN 978-3-319-62044-2
- The Extraterrestrial Encyclopedia (2nd edition, 2016) (with D. Darling)
- How To Develop The Solar System and Beyond: A Roadmap to Interstellar Space (with A. Sinclair and six more authors) (2012) ASIN B009KWNO02
- Megacatastrophes! Nine Strange Ways the World Could End (with D. Darling) (2012) ISBN 978-1-85168-905-7
- A One Way Mission to Mars: Colonizing the Red Planet (with P. Davies and ten more authors; J.S. Levine, editor) (2011) ISBN 978-0-9829552-4-6
- We Are Not Alone: Why We Have Already Found Extraterrestrial Life (with D. Darling) (2010) ISBN 978-1-85168-719-0
- Cosmic Biology: How Life Could Evolve on Other Worlds (with L.N. Irwin) (2010) ISBN 978-1-4419-1646-4

=== Science fiction novel ===
- Alien Encounter: A Scientific Novel (2nd ed.) (2013) ISBN 3319019600
- Voids of Eternity: Alien Encounter (2009) ISBN 978-0-615-27540-6
