= Kepler-160 =

Star

Observation data Epoch J2000 Equinox ICRS
- Constellation: Lyra
- Right ascension: 19^{h} 11^{m} 05.6526^{s}
- Declination: +42° 52′ 09.473″
- Apparent magnitude (V): 13.101

Characteristics
- Evolutionary stage: subgiant
- Spectral type: G5
- J−H color index: 0.359
- J−K color index: 0.408
- Variable type: ROT, Planetary transit

Astrometry
Proper motion (μ)	RA: 3.477(16) mas/yr Dec.: −5.233(19) mas/yr
Parallax (π)	1.0644±0.0154 mas
Distance	3,060 ± 40 ly (940 ± 10 pc)

Details
Mass	1.01 M_{☉}
Radius	1.118^{+0.015}_{−0.045} R_{☉}
Luminosity	1.01±0.05 L_{☉}
Surface gravity (log g)	4.33 cgs
Temperature	5471^{+115}_{−37} K
Metallicity [Fe/H]	0.26 dex
Rotation	77 days
Rotational velocity (v sin i)	1.3 km/s
Age	8 Gyr

Other designations
- KOI-456, KIC 7269974, 2MASS J19110565+4252094, Gaia DR3 2102587087846067712

Database references
SIMBAD	data
Exoplanet Archive	data
KIC	data

Kepler-160 is a G-type subgiant star approximately the width of our Galactic arm away in the constellation Lyra, first studied in detail by the Kepler Mission, a NASA-led operation tasked with discovering terrestrial planets. The star, which is very similar to the Sun in mass and radius, has three confirmed planets and one unconfirmed planet orbiting it.

== Characteristics ==
The star Kepler-160 is rather old, having no detectable circumstellar disk. The star's metallicity is unknown, with conflicting values of either 40% or 160% of solar metallicity reported.

Despite having at least one potentially Earth-like planet (KOI-456.04), the Breakthrough Listen search for extraterrestrial intelligence found no potential technosignatures.

== Planetary system ==
The two planetary candidates in the Kepler-160 system were discovered in 2010, published in early 2011 and confirmed in 2014. The planets Kepler-160b and Kepler-160c are not in orbital resonance despite their orbital periods ratio being close to 1:3.

An additional rocky transiting planet candidate KOI-456.04, located in the habitable zone, was detected in 2020, and more non-transiting planets are suspected due to residuals in the solution for the transit timing variations. From what researchers can tell, KOI-456.04 looks to be less than twice the size of Earth and is apparently orbiting Kepler-160 at about the same distance from Earth to the sun (one complete orbit is 378 days). Perhaps most important, it receives about 93% as much light as Earth gets from the sun. Nontransiting planet candidate Kepler-160d has a mass between about 1 and 100 Earth masses and an orbital period between about 7 and 50 d.

The Kepler-160 planetary system
Companion (in order from star)	Mass	Semimajor axis (AU)	Orbital period (days)	Eccentricity	Inclination (°)	Radius
b	—	0.05511^{+0.0019}_{−0.0037}	4.309397^{+0.000013}_{−0.000012}	0	—	1.715^{+0.061}_{−0.047} R_{🜨}
c	—	0.1192^{+0.004}_{−0.008}	13.699429±0.000018	0	—	3.76^{+0.23}_{−0.09} R_{🜨}
d	1—100 M_{🜨}	—	7—50	—	—	—
e (unconfirmed)	—	1.089^{+0.037}_{−0.073}	378.417^{+0.028}_{−0.025}	0	—	1.91^{+0.17}_{−0.14} R_{🜨}

== See also ==
- List of exoplanets discovered in 2014
- List of exoplanets discovered in 2020
- Kepler space telescope
