= List of exoplanets discovered by the Kepler space telescope: 1–500 =

This is a partial list of exoplanets discovered by the Kepler space telescope, running from star number 1 through 500, inclusive.

Table keys
Planet type
Circumbinary planet
Planet orbits a single star in a multiple star system
Planet has a circumbinary orbit in a system with more than 2 stars
Planet discovered by Kepler community
Potentially habitable
None of the above

== Table ==
Planet	Discovery method	Mass (M_{J})	Radius (R_{J})	Density (g/cm^{3})	Orbital period (days)	Semimajor axis (AU)	Orbital eccentricity	Year of confirmation	Ref.
Earth (for reference)		0.00315	0.0892	5.515	365.2563	1	0.0167	—	
TrES-2b (Kepler-1b)	Transit	1.197	1.247	0.8	2.47061317	0.0367	—	2006	
HAT-P-7b (Kepler-2b)	Transit	1.781	1.419	0.8	2.2047354	0.0355	0	2008	
HAT-P-11b (Kepler-3b)	Transit	0.081	0.422	1.33	4.887802443±0.000000034	0.053	0.0198	2009	
Kepler-4b	Transit	0.077±0.012	0.357±0.019	1.91+0.36 −0.47	3.21346 ±0.00022	0.0456±0.0009	0	2010	
Kepler-5b	Transit	2.111+0.067 −0.086	1.426+0.036 −0.051	0.4±0.5	3.5484657 ±0.0000007	0.0538+0.0015 −0.0021	—	2010	
Kepler-6b	Transit	0.668+0.038 −0.035	1.304+0.018 −0.033	0.4+0.06 −0.04	3.2346996 ±0.0000004	0.04852+0.00074 −0.00133	—	2010	
Kepler-7b	Transit	0.441+0.043 −0.042	1.622±0.013	0.14±0.02	4.8854892 ±0.0000009	0.06067±0.00059	—	2010	
Kepler-8b	Transit	0.59+0.13 −0.12	1.416+0.053 −0.062	0.27+0.11 −0.08	3.5224991 ±0.0000007	0.0474+0.0018 −0.0021	—	2010	
Kepler-9b	Transit	0.252±0.013	0.842±0.069	0.524±0.132	19.24	0.14±0.001	0.15	2010	
Kepler-9c	Transit	0.171±0.013	0.823±0.067	0.383±0.098	38.91	0.225±0.001	0.13	2010	
Kepler-9d	Transit	—	0.146+0.017 −0.012	—	1.592851 ±0.000045	0.0273+0.00042 −0.00043	—	2010	
Kepler-10b	Transit	0.0145+0.004 −0.0046	0.132+0.004 −0.003	8±3	0.837491 ±0.000002	0.0172+0.00081 −0.00168	—	2011	
Kepler-10c	Transit	0.054±0.006	0.21+0.008 −0.004	7.1±1	45.294301 ±0.000048	—	0	2011	
Kepler-11b	Transit	0.006+0.004 −0.003	0.161+0.003 −0.004	1.72+1.25 −0.91	10.3039 ±0.0006	0.091±0.001	0.045+0.068 −0.042	2010	
Kepler-11c	Transit	0.009+0.009 −0.005	0.256+0.004 −0.005	0.66+0.66 −0.35	13.0241 ±0.0013	0.107±0.001	0.026+0.063 −0.013	2010	
Kepler-11d	Transit	0.023+0.003 −0.005	0.278+0.005 −0.006	1.28+0.14 −0.27	22.6845 ±0.0009	0.155±0.001	0.004+0.007 −0.002	2010	
Kepler-11e	Transit	0.025+0.005 −0.007	0.374+0.006 −0.008	0.58+0.11 −0.16	31.9996 ±0.0008	0.195±0.002	0.012±0.006	2010	
Kepler-11f	Transit	0.006±0.003	0.222+0.004 −0.006	0.69+0.29 −0.32	46.6888 ±0.0027	0.25±0.002	0.013+0.011 −0.009	2010	
Kepler-11g	Transit	0.079	0.297+0.005 −0.007	4	118.3807 ±0.001	0.466±0.004	0.15	2010	
Kepler-12b	Transit	0.432+0.053 −0.051	1.754+0.031 −0.036	0.11±0.02	4.4379629 ±0.0000006	0.0553+0.001 −0.0012	—	2011	
Kepler-13b	Transit	9.28	1.512	3.6	1.763588	0.03641	0.001	2011	
Kepler-14b	Transit	8.4+0.35 −0.34	1.136+0.073 −0.054	7.1±1.1	6.790123 ±0.0000043	—	0.035±0.02	2011	
Kepler-15b	Transit	0.66+0.08 −0.09	0.96+0.06 −0.07	0.93+0.18 −0.22	4.942782 ±0.0000013	0.05714+0.00086 −0.00093	0.06	2011	
Kepler-16b	Transit	0.333±0.016	0.754±0.003	0.964+0.047 −0.046	228.776 ±0.02	0.7048±0.0011	0.0069+0.001 −0.0015	2011	
Kepler-17b	Transit	2.45±0.11	1.31±0.02	1.35±0.08	1.4857108 ±0.0000002	0.02591+0.00037 −0.00036	0.011	2011	
Kepler-18b	Transit	0.022±0.011	0.178±0.009	4.9±2.4	3.504725 ±0.000028	0.0447±0.0006	0	2011	
Kepler-18c	Transit	0.054±0.006	0.49±0.023	0.59±0.07	7.64159 ±0.00003	0.0752±0.0011	0	2011	
Kepler-18d	Transit	0.052±0.004	0.623±0.029	0.27±0.03	14.85888 ±0.00004	0.1172±0.0017	0	2011	
Kepler-19b	Transit	0.02643+0.00503 −0.00472	—	—	9.28716 ±0.00004	—	0.12±0.02	2011	
Kepler-19c	Transit Timing Variations	0.04122±0.0085	—	—	28.731 ±0.012	—	0.21+0.05 −0.07	2011	
Kepler-19d	Radial Velocity	0.07079+0.00378 −0.01762	0.000000486	—	62.95 ±0.04	—	0.05+0.16 −0.01	2011	
Kepler-20b	Transit	0.03052+0.00444 −0.00453	0.167+0.006 −0.003	8.2+1.5 −1.3	3.69611525 ±0.00000115	0.0463+0.0009 −0.0015	0.03+0.09 −0.03	2011	
Kepler-20c	Transit	0.04012+0.00683 −0.00705	0.272+0.006 −0.005	2.5±0.5	10.85409089 ±0.00000303	0.0949+0.0027 −0.0023	0.16+0.01 −0.09	2011	
Kepler-20d	Transit	0.03168+0.01249 −0.01164	0.245+0.007 −0.005	2.7+1.1 −1	77.61130017 ±0.00012305	0.3506+0.0081 −0.0101	—	2011	
Kepler-20e	Transit	—	0.077±0.002	—	6.09852281 ±0.00000608	0.0639+0.0019 −0.0014	—	2011	
Kepler-20f	Transit	—	0.089+0.004 −0.008	—	19.57758478 ±0.00009037	0.1396+0.0036 −0.0035	—	2012	
Kepler-20g	Radial Velocity	0.0628+0.00969 −0.01136	—	—	34.94 ±0.038	0.2055+0.0022 −0.0021	0.15+0.01 −0.1	2011	
Kepler-21b	Transit	0.01598±0.00541	0.146+0.002 −0.001	6.4±2.1	2.78578 ±0.00003	0.042717	0.02±0.1	2011	
Kepler-22b	Transit	0.113	0.212±0.012	14.7	289.8623 ±0.0016	0.849+0.018 −0.017	0	2011	
Kepler-23b	Transit	0.8	0.17	—	7.1073	0.075	—	2011	
Kepler-23c	Transit	2.7	0.285	—	10.7421	0.099	—	2011	
Kepler-23d	Transit	—	0.196±0.008	—	15.274299 ±0.000104	0.124	—	2011	
Kepler-24b	Transit	1.6	0.214	—	8.1453	0.08	—	2014	
Kepler-24c	Transit	1.6	0.25	—	12.3335	0.106	—	2014	
Kepler-24d	Transit	—	0.149±0.035	—	4.244384 ±0.000053	0.051	—	2011	
Kepler-24e	Transit	—	0.248±0.057	—	18.998355 ±0.000157	0.138	—	2011	
Kepler-25b	Transit	0.0302±0.01321	0.242±0.004	2.5±1.1	6.2385	—	—	2014	
Kepler-25c	Transit	0.0774±0.01793	0.464±0.008	0.9±0.21	12.7204	—	—	2011	
Kepler-25d	Radial Velocity	0.283±0.043	—	—	123 ±2	—	—	2011	
Kepler-26b	Transit	0.01611+0.00205 −0.00192	0.248±0.01	1.26+0.21 −0.19	12.28 ±0.0003	—	—	2014	
Kepler-26c	Transit	0.01951±0.00205	0.243±0.011	1.61+0.27 −0.22	17.2559 ±0.0006	—	—	2014	
Kepler-26d	Transit	—	0.095±0.005	—	3.543919 ±0.000015	0.039	—	2011	
Kepler-26e	Transit	—	0.215±0.013	—	46.827915 ±0.000173	0.22	—	2011	
Kepler-27b	Transit	9.11	0.357	—	15.3348	0.118	—	2011	
Kepler-27c	Transit	13.8	0.437	—	31.3309	0.191	—	2011	
Kepler-28b	Transit	1.51	0.321	—	5.9123	0.062	—	2011	
Kepler-28c	Transit	1.36	0.303	—	8.9858	0.081	—	2011	
Kepler-29b	Transit	0.01419+0.00444 −0.00463	0.299±0.02	0.65+0.27 −0.23	10.3384 ±0.0003	—	—	2012	
Kepler-29c	Transit	0.01259+0.00387 −0.00406	0.28±0.018	0.7+0.29 −0.25	13.2884 ±0.0005	—	—	2012	
Kepler-30b	Transit	0.036±0.004	0.348±0.018	1.02±0.13	29.33434 ±0.00815	0.18	0.042±0.003	2012	
Kepler-30c	Transit	2.01±0.16	1.097±0.036	1.88±0.17	60.323105 ±0.000244	0.3	0.0111±0.001	2011	
Kepler-30d	Transit	0.073±0.008	0.785±0.045	0.19±0.02	143.34394 ±0.00858	0.5	0.022±0.005	2011	
Kepler-31b	Transit	—	0.491±0.098	—	20.8613 ±0.0002	0.16	—	2014	
Kepler-31c	Transit	4.7	0.473±0.098	—	42.6318 ±0.0005	0.26	—	2011	
Kepler-31d	Transit	6.8	0.348±0.071	—	87.6451 ±0.0014	0.4	—	2011	
Kepler-32b	Transit	4.1	0.196±0.018	—	5.90124 ±0.0001	0.05	—	2012	
Kepler-32c	Transit	0.5	0.178±0.018	—	8.7522 ±0.0003	0.09	—	2012	
Kepler-32d	Transit	—	0.241±0.018	—	22.7802 ±0.0005	0.13	—	2012	
Kepler-32e	Transit	—	0.134±0.009	—	2.896 ±0.0003	0.033	—	2011	
Kepler-32f	Transit	—	0.073±0.006	—	0.74296 ±0.00007	0.013	—	2011	
Kepler-33b	Transit	—	0.155±0.016	—	5.66793 ±0.00012	0.0677±0.0014	0	2011	
Kepler-33c	Transit	—	0.285±0.027	—	13.17562 ±0.00014	0.1189±0.0025	0	2011	
Kepler-33d	Transit	—	0.477±0.044	—	21.77596 ±0.00011	0.1662±0.0035	0	2011	
Kepler-33e	Transit	—	0.359±0.034	—	31.7844 ±0.00039	0.2138±0.0045	0	2011	
Kepler-33f	Transit	—	0.398±0.037	—	41.02902 ±0.00042	0.2535±0.0054	0	2011	
Kepler-34b	Transit	0.22+0.011 −0.01	0.764+0.012 −0.014	0.613+0.045 −0.041	288.822 ±0.063	1.0896±0.0009	0.182+0.016 −0.02	2012	
Kepler-35b	Transit	0.127±0.02	0.728±0.014	0.41+0.07 −0.069	131.458 ±0.077	0.60347+0.00101 −0.00103	0.042+0.007 −0.004	2012	
Kepler-36b	Transit	0.014±0.001	0.133±0.003	7.46+0.74 −0.59	13.83989 ±0.00082	0.1153±0.0015	0.039	2013	
Kepler-36c	Transit	0.025+0.002 −0.001	0.328±0.005	0.89+0.07 −0.05	16.23855 ±0.00038	0.1283±0.0016	0.033	2013	
Kepler-37b	Transit	0.03146	0.029±0.002	—	13.3675	—	—	2013	
Kepler-37c	Transit	0.03776	0.067±0.003	—	21.302	—	—	2014	
Kepler-37d	Transit	0.03839	0.173±0.005	—	39.7922	—	—	2012	
Kepler-37e	Transit Timing Variations	—	—	—	51.196	—	—	2011	
Kepler-38b	Transit	0.384	0.384±0.01	—	105.599 ±0.038	0.4632+0.0082 −0.0092	0.032	2010	
Kepler-39b	Transit	20.1±1.3	1.24+0.09 −0.1	13+3 −2.2	21.08721 ±0.000037	0.164±0.003	0.112±0.057	2011	
Kepler-40b	Transit	2.2±0.4	1.17±0.04	1.68+0.53 −0.43	6.87349 ±0.00064	0.08±0.003	0	2011	
Kepler-41b	Transit	0.56±0.08	1.29±0.02	0.33±0.04	1.8555582 ±0.00000052	0.03101±0.0004	0	2011	
Kepler-42b	Transit	—	0.07±0.02	—	1.2137672 ±0.0000046	0.0116	—	2011	
Kepler-42c	Transit	—	0.065±0.018	—	0.45328509 ±0.00000097	0.006	—	2011	
Kepler-42d	Transit	—	0.051±0.016	—	1.865169 ±0.000014	0.0154	—	2011	
Kepler-43b	Transit	3.23±0.26	1.219+0.065 −0.064	5+7 −5	3.0240949 ±0.0000006	0.046+0.0026 −0.0025	—	2011	
Kepler-44b	Transit	1±0.1	1.09±0.07	0.93+0.19 −0.17	3.2467293 ±0.000003	0.0446±0.0011	0.066	2012	
Kepler-45b	Transit	0.505±0.09	0.96±0.11	0.8±0.5	2.455239 ±0.000004	0.03	0.11+0.1 −0.09	2012	
Kepler-46b	Transit	6	0.808+0.042 −0.043	14	33.60134 ±0.00021	0.1968+0.0029 −0.0028	0.01±0.01	2014	
Kepler-46c	Transit Timing Variations	0.376+0.021 −0.019	—	—	57.011 ±0.051	0.2799+0.0041 −0.004	0.0146+0.0034 −0.0036	2012	
Kepler-46d	Transit	—	0.146±0.082	—	6.766589 ±0.000022	0.067	—	2012	
Kepler-47b	Transit	0.027	0.27±0.011	—	49.532 ±0.04	0.2962+0.0044 −0.0047	0.035	2012	
Kepler-47c	Transit	0.073	0.411±0.018	—	303.137 ±0.072	0.991+0.015 −0.016	0.411	2012	
Kepler-48b	Transit	0.0124±0.00661	0.168±0.009	3.23±1.84	4.778	—	—	2014	
Kepler-48c	Transit	0.04597±0.00724	0.242±0.012	4.01±0.91	9.67395	—	—	2014	
Kepler-48d	Transit	0.025±0.0145	0.182±0.01	5.08±3.12	42.8961	—	—	2012	
Kepler-48e	Radial Velocity	2.067±0.079	—	—	982 ±8	—	—	2012	
Kepler-48f	Radial Velocity	0.93±0.079	—	—	5205	—	—		
Kepler-49b	Transit	0.98	0.243	—	7.2037945 ±0.000022	—	—	2014	
Kepler-49c	Transit	0.72	0.227	—	10.9129343 ±0.000069	—	—	2014	
Kepler-49d	Transit	—	0.143±0.006	—	2.576549 ±0.000003	0.031	—	2012	
Kepler-49e	Transit	—	0.139±0.007	—	18.596108 ±0.000079	0.116	—	2012	
Kepler-50b	Transit	—	0.153+0.004 −0.009	—	7.81254 ±0.0001	0.077+0.012 −0.02	—	2012	
Kepler-50c	Transit	—	0.194+0.006 −0.007	—	9.37647 ±0.00004	0.087+0.014 −0.023	—	2012	
Kepler-51b	Transit	0.007+0.005 −0.003	0.633±0.027	0.03+0.02 −0.01	45.154 ±0.0002	0.2514±0.0097	0.04±0.01	2014	
Kepler-51c	Transit	0.013±0.001	0.803+0.25 −0.152	0.03+0.02 −0.03	85.312 ±0.003	0.384±0.015	0.014+0.013 −0.009	2012	
Kepler-51d	Transit	0.024±0.003	0.865±0.045	0.046±0.009	130.194 ±0.005	0.509±0.02	0.008+0.011 −0.008	2012	
Kepler-52b	Transit	8.7	0.187	—	7.8773565 ±0.000038	—	—	2014	
Kepler-52c	Transit	10.41	0.164	—	16.3850021 ±0.00014	—	—	2012	
Kepler-52d	Transit	—	0.174±0.019	—	36.445171 ±0.000253	0.182	—	2012	
Kepler-53b	Transit	18.41	0.258	—	18.6489525 ±0.00016	—	—	2014	
Kepler-53c	Transit	15.74	0.283	—	38.5583038 ±0.00041	—	—	2012	
Kepler-53d	Transit	—	0.189±0.094	—	9.751962 ±0.000077	0.091	—	2012	
Kepler-54b	Transit	0.92	0.187	—	8.0109434 ±0.000069	—	—	2014	
Kepler-54c	Transit	0.37	0.11	—	12.0717249 ±0.00029	—	—	2012	
Kepler-54d	Transit	—	0.136±0.007	—	20.995694 ±0.000143	0.126	—	2012	
Kepler-55b	Transit	1.49	0.217	—	27.9481449 ±0.00024	—	—	2014	
Kepler-55c	Transit	1.11	0.197	—	42.1516418 ±0.00053	—	—	2014	
Kepler-55d	Transit	—	0.142±0.008	—	2.211099 ±0.000004	0.029	—	2014	
Kepler-55e	Transit	—	0.138±0.021	—	4.617534 ±0.000021	0.048	—	2012	
Kepler-55f	Transit	—	0.142±0.009	—	10.198545 ±0.000045	0.081	—	2012	
Kepler-56b	Transit	0.07+0.012 −0.011	0.581+0.026 −0.025	0.442+0.08 −0.072	10.5016 ±0.0011	0.1028±0.0037	—	2016	
Kepler-56c	Transit	0.57+0.066 −0.06	0.874±0.041	1.06+0.14 −0.13	21.40239 ±0.00059	0.1652±0.0059	—	2012	
Kepler-56d	Radial Velocity	5.61±0.38	—	—	1002 ±5	2.16±0.08	0.2±0.01	2012	
Kepler-57b	Transit	18.86	0.195	—	5.7293196 ±0.000018	—	—	2012	
Kepler-57c	Transit	6.95	0.138	—	11.6092567 ±0.000086	—	—	2012	
Kepler-58b	Transit	1.39	0.248	—	10.2184954 ±0.00015	—	—	2014	
Kepler-58c	Transit	2.19	0.255	—	15.5741568 ±0.00027	—	—	2012	
Kepler-58d	Transit	—	0.262±0.125	—	40.101371 ±0.000612	0.236	—	2012	
Kepler-59b	Transit	2.05	0.098	—	11.8681707 ±0.00036	—	—	2012	
Kepler-59c	Transit	1.37	0.177	—	17.9801235 ±0.0003	—	—	2012	
Kepler-60b	Transit	0.01318+0.00176 −0.00164	0.153±0.012	4.62+1.4 −1.1	7.1334 ±0.0001	—	—	2012	
Kepler-60c	Transit	0.01211±0.00255	0.17±0.013	3.06+1.14 −0.86	8.9187 ±0.0002	—	—	2013	
Kepler-60d	Transit	0.01309+0.00264 −0.00236	0.178±0.014	2.91+1.03 −0.78	11.8981 ±0.0002	—	—	2013	
Kepler-61b	Transit	—	0.192±0.012	—	59.87756 ±0.0002	—	0.25	2013	
Kepler-62b	Transit	0.03	0.117±0.004	—	5.714932 ±0.000009	0.0553±0.0005	—	2013	
Kepler-62c	Transit	0.013	0.048±0.003	—	12.4417 ±0.0001	0.0929±0.0009	—	2013	
Kepler-62d	Transit	0.044	0.174±0.006	—	18.16406 ±0.00002	0.12±0.001	—	2013	
Kepler-62e	Transit	0.113	0.144±0.004	—	122.3874 ±0.0008	0.427±0.004	—	2013	
Kepler-62f	Transit	0.11	0.126±0.006	—	267.291 ±0.005	0.718±0.007	—	2012	
Kepler-63b	Transit	0.378	0.545±0.018	3	9.4341505 ±0.000001	0.08±0.002	0.45	2012	
Kepler-64b (PH1 b)	Transit	0.531	0.551	—	138.317	0.652	0.07	2013	
Kepler-65b	Transit	—	0.127±0.003	—	2.15491 ±0.000005	0.035+0.002 −0.001	—	2012	
Kepler-65c	Transit	—	0.23±0.005	—	5.859944 ±0.000003	0.068+0.004 −0.002	—	2013	
Kepler-65d	Transit	—	0.136±0.004	—	8.13123 ±0.00002	0.084+0.006 −0.002	—	2013	
Kepler-66b	Transit	—	0.25±0.014	—	17.815815 ±0.000075	0.1352±0.0017	—	2013	
Kepler-67b	Transit	—	0.262±0.014	—	15.7259 ±0.00011	0.1171±0.0015	—	2013	
Kepler-68b	Transit	0.01878±0.00535	0.208±0.002	2.6±0.74	5.39875	—	—	2013	
Kepler-68c	Transit	0.02265	0.089±0.002	—	9.60504	—	—	2013	
Kepler-68d	Radial Velocity	0.84007±0.05034	—	—	625 ±16	—	—	2013	
Kepler-69b	Transit	—	0.2+0.039 −0.026	—	13.722341 ±0.000035	0.094+0.023 −0.016	0.16+0.17 −0.001	2013	
Kepler-69c	Transit	—	0.153+0.03 −0.021	—	242.4613 ±0.0059	0.64+0.15 −0.11	0.14+0.18 −0.1	2013	
Kepler-70b	Transit	0.0014	0.068	—	0.240104	0.006	—	2013	
Kepler-70c	Transit	0.002	0.077	—	0.342887	0.0076	—	2013	
Kepler-71b	Transit	—	1.1	—	3.90512	0.0477	0	2013	
Kepler-74b	Transit	0.63±0.12	0.96±0.02	0.88±0.18	7.340711 ±0.000006	0.0781±0.0007	0	2013	
Kepler-75b	Transit	10.1±0.4	1.05±0.03	11+0.8 −0.9	8.8849116 ±0.0000034	0.0818±0.0012	0.57±0.01	2013	
Kepler-76b	Orbital Brightness Modulation	2.01+0.37 −0.35	1.36±0.12	1.1+0.6 −0.4	1.5449298 ±0.0000004	0.0274+0.002 −0.0019	—	2013	
Kepler-77b	Transit	0.43±0.032	0.96±0.016	0.603±0.055	3.57878087 ±0.00000023	0.04501±0.00063	0	2012	
Kepler-78b	Transit	0.006±0.001	0.105+0.014 −0.008	5.57+3.02 −1.31	0.355 ±0.0004	—	0	2012	
Kepler-79b	Transit	0.0343+0.023 −0.019	0.31±0.006	1.43+0.97 −0.78	13.4845 ±0.0002	0.117±0.002	0.015+0.012 −0.006	2014	
Kepler-79c	Transit	0.019+0.006 −0.0072	0.332±0.007	0.62+0.2 −0.25	27.4029 ±0.0008	0.187+0.002 −0.003	0.03+0.027 −0.021	2014	
Kepler-79d	Transit	0.019+0.0066 −0.005	0.639+0.012 −0.014	0.09+0.03 −0.02	52.0902 ±0.0009	0.287±0.004	0.025+0.059 −0.023	2012	
Kepler-79e	Transit	0.013+0.0038 −0.0035	0.311±0.012	0.53±0.15	81.0659 ±0.0013	0.386±0.005	0.012+0.044 −0.005	2012	
Kepler-80b	Transit	0.0218+0.0033 −0.0022	0.238±0.009	1.38+0.24 −0.17	7.05246 ±0.0002	0.0648±0.0009	—	2014	
Kepler-80c	Transit	0.02121+0.00387 −0.00271	0.244+0.011 −0.009	1.22+0.23 −0.18	9.52355 ±0.00041	0.0792±0.0011	—	2014	
Kepler-80d	Transit	0.02124+0.00217 −0.0016	0.136+0.008 −0.006	7.04±1.06	3.07222 ±0.00006	0.0372±0.0005	—	2016	
Kepler-80e	Transit	0.01299+0.00255 −0.00299	0.143+0.007 −0.006	3.75+0.89 −0.97	4.64489 ±0.0002	0.0491±0.0007	—	2012	
Kepler-80f	Transit	—	0.108+0.005 −0.004	—	0.9867873 ±0.00000006	0.0175±0.0002	—	2012	
Kepler-81b	Transit	—	0.216±0.034	—	5.955	—	—	2014	
Kepler-81c	Transit	—	0.211±0.033	—	12.04	—	—	2012	
Kepler-81d	Transit	—	0.108±0.024	—	20.837846 ±0.000181	0.128	—	2012	
Kepler-82b	Transit	—	0.357±0.162	—	26.444	—	—	2014	
Kepler-82c	Transit	—	0.477±0.218	—	51.538	—	—	2014	
Kepler-82d	Transit	—	0.158±0.024	—	2.382961 ±0.000005	0.034	—	2012	
Kepler-82e	Transit	—	0.22±0.033	—	5.902206 ±0.000012	0.063	—	2012	
Kepler-83b	Transit	—	0.252±0.037	—	9.77	—	—	2014	
Kepler-83c	Transit	—	0.211±0.031	—	20.09	—	—	2012	
Kepler-83d	Transit	—	0.173±0.012	—	5.169796 ±0.000016	0.051	—	2012	
Kepler-84b	Transit	—	0.199±0.009	—	8.726	—	—	2014	
Kepler-84c	Transit	—	0.211±0.01	—	12.883	—	—	2014	
Kepler-84d	Transit	—	0.123±0.024	—	4.224537 ±0.000042	0.052	—	2014	
Kepler-84e	Transit	—	0.232±0.044	—	27.434389 ±0.000224	0.181	—	2012	
Kepler-84f	Transit	—	0.196±0.038	—	44.552169 ±0.000812	0.25	—	2012	
Kepler-85b	Transit	—	0.176±0.009	—	8.306	—	—	2014	
Kepler-85c	Transit	—	0.194±0.009	—	12.513	—	—	2014	
Kepler-85d	Transit	—	0.107±0.017	—	17.91323 ±0.000266	0.13	—	2013	
Kepler-85e	Transit	—	0.113±0.018	—	25.216751 ±0.000718	0.163	—	2013	
Kepler-86b (PH2 b)	Transit	—	0.903	—	282.5255	0.828	0.4	2013	
Kepler-87b	Transit	1.02±0.028	1.204±0.049	0.729±0.026	114.73635 ±0.00015	0.481+0.026 −0.028	0.036±0.009	2013	
Kepler-87c	Transit	0.02±0.003	0.548±0.026	0.152±0.019	191.2318 ±0.0015	0.676+0.037 −0.04	0.039±0.012	2013	
Kepler-88b	Transit	0.027	0.337	0.87	10.95416	0.098	0.056	2013	
Kepler-88c	Transit	0.626	—	—	22.3395	0.15525	0.056	2013	
Kepler-89b	Transit	0.033	0.153	10	3.743208	0.05119	0.25	2013	
Kepler-89c	Transit	0.049	0.385	0.9	10.423648	0.1013	0.43	2013	
Kepler-89d	Transit	0.334	1.005	0.363	22.342989	0.1684	0.022	2013	
Kepler-89e	Transit	0.1	0.585	0.6	54.3203	0.3046	0.019	2013	
Kepler-90b	Transit	—	0.117	—	7.00815	0.074	—	2013	
Kepler-90c	Transit	—	0.106	—	8.719375	0.089	—	2013	
Kepler-90d	Transit	—	0.256	—	59.73667	0.32	—	2013	
Kepler-90e	Transit	—	0.237	—	91.93913	0.42	—	2013	
Kepler-90f	Transit	—	0.257	—	124.9144	0.48	—	2013	
Kepler-90g	Transit	—	0.723	—	210.60697	0.7	—	2013	
Kepler-90h	Transit	—	1.008	—	331.60059	1	—	2013	
Kepler-91b	Transit	0.81+0.18 −0.17	1.367+0.069 −0.06	0.4+0.2 −0.1	6.24658 ±0.00008	0.0731+0.0034 −0.0031	—	2013	
Kepler-92b	Transit	0.202±0.044	0.313±0.009	—	13.749	—	—	2013	
Kepler-92c	Transit	0.019±0.006	0.232±0.007	—	26.723	—	—	2014	
Kepler-92d	Transit	—	0.184±0.005	—	49.3568 ±0.0024	—	0.07+0.34 −0.04	2014	
Kepler-93b	Transit	0.01265±0.00214	0.132±0.002	6.88±1.18	4.72673978 ±0.00000097	0.053±0.002	0	2014	
Kepler-93c	Radial Velocity	3	—	—	1460	—	—	2014	
Kepler-94b	Transit	0.034±0.004	0.313±0.013	1.45±0.26	2.50806	—	—	2014	
Kepler-94c	Radial Velocity	9.836±0.629	—	—	820.3 ±3	—	—	2014	
Kepler-95b	Transit	0.041±0.009	0.305±0.008	1.71±0.37	11.5231	—	—	2014	
Kepler-96b	Transit	0.027±0.011	0.238±0.02	2.26±1.11	16.2385	—	—	2014	
Kepler-97b	Transit	0.011±0.006	0.132±0.012	5.44±3.48	2.58664	—	—	2014	
Kepler-97c	Radial Velocity	1.08	—	—	789	—	—	2014	
Kepler-98b	Transit	0.011±0.005	0.178±0.02	2.18±1.21	1.54168	—	—	2014	
Kepler-99b	Transit	0.019±0.004	0.132±0.007	10.9±2.82	4.60358	—	—	2014	
Kepler-100b	Transit	0.023±0.01	0.118±0.004	14.25±6.33	6.88705	—	—	2014	
Kepler-100c	Transit	—	0.196±0.004	—	12.8159	—	—	2014	
Kepler-100d	Transit	—	0.144±0.004	—	35.3331	—	—	2014	
Kepler-101b	Transit	0.16+0.02 −0.01	0.51+0.08 −0.07	1.45+0.83 −0.48	3.4876812 ±0.000007	0.0474+0.001 −0.0008	0.086+0.08 −0.059	2014	
Kepler-101c	Transit	0.01	0.112+0.017 −0.015	10.5	6.02976 ±0.000075	0.0684±0.0014	0	2014	
Kepler-102b	Transit	—	0.042±0.002	—	5.28696	—	—	2014	
Kepler-102c	Transit	—	0.052±0.002	—	7.07142	—	—	2013	
Kepler-102d	Transit	0.012±0.006	0.105±0.004	13.27±6.46	10.3117	—	—	2014	
Kepler-102e	Transit	0.028±0.006	0.198±0.006	4.68±1.12	16.1457	—	—	2014	
Kepler-102f	Transit	—	0.079±0.003	—	27.4536	—	—	2014	
Kepler-103b	Transit	0.031±0.027	0.301±0.008	1.38±1.4	15.9654	—	—	2014	
Kepler-103c	Transit	0.114±0.079	0.459±0.012	1.47±1.2	179.612	—	—	2014	
Kepler-104b	Transit	—	0.277±0.047	—	11.427548 ±0.000015	0.094	—	2014	
Kepler-104c	Transit	—	0.279±0.049	—	23.668205 ±0.000056	0.153	—	2013	
Kepler-104d	Transit	—	0.319±0.054	—	51.755394 ±0.00016	0.257	—	2014	
Kepler-105b	Transit	—	0.429±0.136	—	5.4122 ±0.00002	0.066±0.003	0.47+0.05 −0.47	2014	
Kepler-105c	Transit	0.01447+0.00289 −0.00267	0.117±0.006	11.2+3 −2.56	7.1262 ±0.0002	—	—	2014	
Kepler-106b	Transit	—	0.073±0.01	—	6.16486	—	—	2014	
Kepler-106c	Transit	0.033±0.01	0.223±0.029	3.28±1.56	13.5708	—	—	2014	
Kepler-106d	Transit	—	0.085±0.012	—	23.9802	—	—	2014	
Kepler-106e	Transit	0.035±0.018	0.228±0.029	3.1±2.07	43.8445	—	—	2014	
Kepler-107b	Transit	—	0.139±0.005	—	3.179997 ±0.000011	0.044	—	2014	
Kepler-107c	Transit	—	0.161±0.016	—	4.901425 ±0.000016	0.059	—	2014	
Kepler-107d	Transit	—	0.095±0.005	—	7.958203 ±0.000104	0.082	—	2014	
Kepler-107e	Transit	—	0.308±0.022	—	14.749049 ±0.000034	0.123	—	2014	
Kepler-108b	Transit	—	0.772±0.043	—	49.183921 ±0.000054	0.292	—	2014	
Kepler-108c	Transit	—	0.73±0.045	—	190.323494 ±0.000988	0.721	—	2014	
Kepler-109b	Transit	—	0.211±0.006	—	6.48163	—	—	2014	
Kepler-109c	Transit	—	0.225±0.006	—	21.2227	—	—	2014	
Kepler-110b	Transit	—	0.163±0.032	—	12.691112 ±0.000036	0.107	—	2014	
Kepler-110c	Transit	—	0.197±0.039	—	31.719775 ±0.000104	0.198	—	2014	
Kepler-111b	Transit	—	0.141±0.018	—	3.341815 ±0.000006	0.046	—	2014	
Kepler-111c	Transit	—	0.651±0.081	—	224.784608 ±0.000411	0.761	—	2014	
Kepler-112b	Transit	—	0.211±0.051	—	8.408878 ±0.00001	0.076	—	2014	
Kepler-112c	Transit	—	0.214±0.052	—	28.574263 ±0.00006	0.172	—	2014	
Kepler-113b	Transit	0.037±0.013	0.162±0.004	10.73±3.9	4.754	—	—	2014	
Kepler-113c	Transit	—	0.194±0.005	—	8.92507	—	—	2013	
Kepler-114b	Transit	—	0.112±0.012	—	5.188549 ±0.000012	0.053	—	2013	
Kepler-114c	Transit	0.009±0.002	0.143±0.016	—	8.041	—	—	2014	
Kepler-114d	Transit	0.012±0.005	0.226±0.025	—	11.776	—	—	2014	
Kepler-115b	Transit	—	0.097±0.019	—	2.403679 ±0.000012	0.036	—	2014	
Kepler-115c	Transit	—	0.232±0.045	—	8.990889 ±0.000021	0.087	—	2014	
Kepler-116b	Transit	—	0.305±0.058	—	5.968734 ±0.000009	0.069	—	2014	
Kepler-116c	Transit	—	0.205±0.039	—	13.07163 ±0.000056	0.116	—	2014	
Kepler-117b	Transit	0.094±0.033	0.719±0.024	0.3±0.11	18.7959228 ±0.0000075	0.1445+0.0047 −0.0014	0.0493±0.0062	2014	
Kepler-117c	Transit	1.84±0.18	1.101±0.035	1.74±0.18	50.790391 ±0.000014	0.2804+0.0092 −0.0028	0.0323±0.0033	2014	
Kepler-118b	Transit	—	0.175±0.084	—	7.518496 ±0.000056	0.073	—	2014	
Kepler-118c	Transit	—	0.685±0.306	—	20.17202 ±0.000013	0.141	—	2014	
Kepler-119b	Transit	—	0.321±0.122	—	2.422082 ±0.000001	0.035	—	2014	
Kepler-119c	Transit	—	0.082±0.031	—	4.125103 ±0.000028	0.049	—	2014	
Kepler-120b	Transit	—	0.192±0.015	—	6.312501 ±0.000008	0.055	—	2014	
Kepler-120c	Transit	—	0.136±0.008	—	12.794585 ±0.000044	0.088	—	2014	
Kepler-121b	Transit	—	0.209±0.113	—	3.177422 ±0.000003	0.039	—	2014	
Kepler-121c	Transit	—	0.203±0.112	—	41.008011 ±0.000191	0.216	—	2014	
Kepler-122b	Transit	—	0.209±0.041	—	5.766193 ±0.000016	0.064	—	2014	
Kepler-122c	Transit	—	0.524±0.103	—	12.465988 ±0.000009	0.108	—	2014	
Kepler-122d	Transit	—	0.196±0.039	—	21.587475 ±0.000164	0.155	—	2014	
Kepler-122e	Transit	—	0.232±0.048	—	37.993273 ±0.00039	0.227	—	2014	
Kepler-122f	Transit Timing Variations	0.113+0.061 −0.051	0.156+0.054 −0.014	—	56.268	—	—	2014	
Kepler-123b	Transit	—	0.262±0.051	—	17.232366 ±0.000056	0.135	—	2014	
Kepler-123c	Transit	—	0.132±0.027	—	26.695074 ±0.000468	0.181	—	2014	
Kepler-124b	Transit	—	0.065±0.004	—	3.410493 ±0.000021	0.039	—	2014	
Kepler-124c	Transit	—	0.156±0.008	—	13.821375 ±0.000037	0.1	—	2014	
Kepler-124d	Transit	—	0.099±0.006	—	30.950851 ±0.000361	0.17	—	2014	
Kepler-125b	Transit	—	0.211±0.009	—	4.164389 ±0.000003	0.041	—	2014	
Kepler-125c	Transit	—	0.066±0.004	—	5.774464 ±0.000047	0.051	—	2014	
Kepler-126b	Transit	—	0.136±0.009	—	10.495711 ±0.000028	0.099	—	2014	
Kepler-126c	Transit	—	0.141±0.012	—	21.869741 ±0.000082	0.162	—	2014	
Kepler-126d	Transit	—	0.223±0.004	—	100.283134 ±0.000255	0.448	—	2014	
Kepler-127b	Transit	—	0.125±0.004	—	14.435889 ±0.000063	0.125	—	2014	
Kepler-127c	Transit	—	0.237±0.012	—	29.393195 ±0.000073	0.2	—	2013	
Kepler-127d	Transit	—	0.236±0.012	—	48.630408 ±0.000128	0.28	—	2013	
Kepler-128b	Transit	0.097±0.019	0.101±0.003	—	15.09	—	—	2014	
Kepler-128c	Transit	0.105±0.01	0.101±0.003	—	22.804	—	—	2014	
Kepler-129b	Transit	—	0.211±0.019	—	15.79186 ±0.000068	0.131	—	2014	
Kepler-129c	Transit	—	0.227±0.009	—	82.20017 ±0.00068	0.393	—	2014	
Kepler-130b	Transit	—	0.091±0.004	—	8.457458 ±0.000039	0.079	—	2014	
Kepler-130c	Transit	—	0.259±0.022	—	27.50868 ±0.00006	0.178±0.005	0+0.07 −0	2014	
Kepler-130d	Transit	—	0.146±0.014	—	87.517905 ±0.000744	0.377	—	2014	
Kepler-131b	Transit	0.051±0.011	0.215±0.018	6±1.98	16.092	—	—	2014	
Kepler-131c	Transit	0.026±0.019	0.075±0.006	77.7±55	25.5169	—	—	2014	
Kepler-132b	Transit	—	0.108±0.021	—	6.178196 ±0.000022	0.067	—	2014	
Kepler-132c	Transit	—	0.114±0.022	—	6.414914 ±0.000019	0.068	—	2016	
Kepler-132d	Transit	—	0.138±0.027	—	18.010199 ±0.000067	0.136	—	2014	
Kepler-132e	Transit	—	0.105+0.014 −0.011	—	110.2869374 ±0.000878	—	—	2014	
Kepler-133b	Transit	—	0.157±0.027	—	8.129976 ±0.000038	0.083	—	2014	
Kepler-133c	Transit	—	0.253±0.043	—	31.517586 ±0.000158	0.204	—	2014	
Kepler-134b	Transit	—	0.178±0.035	—	5.317429 ±0.000008	0.06	—	2014	
Kepler-134c	Transit	—	0.112±0.022	—	10.105785 ±0.000053	0.092	—	2014	
Kepler-135b	Transit	—	0.161±0.031	—	6.00253 ±0.000016	0.067	—	2014	
Kepler-135c	Transit	—	0.103±0.021	—	11.448708 ±0.000145	0.103	—	2014	
Kepler-136b	Transit	—	0.183±0.034	—	11.5789 ±0.00003	0.106	—	2014	
Kepler-136c	Transit	—	0.178±0.033	—	16.399235 ±0.000051	0.133	—	2014	
Kepler-137b	Transit	—	0.131±0.01	—	8.436387 ±0.000018	0.077	—	2014	
Kepler-137c	Transit	—	0.168±0.012	—	18.735753 ±0.000035	0.13	—	2014	
Kepler-138b	Transit	0.00021+0.00019 −0.00012	0.047±0.003	2.6+2.4 −1.5	10.3126 ±0.0004	—	—	2014	
Kepler-138c	Transit	0.0062+0.00602 −0.00352	0.107±0.006	6.2+5.8 −3.4	13.7813 ±0.0001	—	—	2014	
Kepler-138d	Transit	0.00201+0.00212 −0.00122	0.108±0.007	2.1+2.2 −1.2	23.0881 ±0.0009	—	—	2014	
Kepler-139b	Transit	—	0.262±0.051	—	15.771044 ±0.000037	0.127	—	2014	
Kepler-139c	Transit	—	0.302±0.062	—	157.072878 ±0.00172	0.586	—	2014	
Kepler-140b	Transit	—	0.144±0.028	—	3.25427 ±0.000008	0.045	—	2014	
Kepler-140c	Transit	—	0.161±0.031	—	91.353282 ±0.00137	0.414	—	2014	
Kepler-141b	Transit	—	0.062±0.004	—	3.107675 ±0.000022	0.039	—	2014	
Kepler-141c	Transit	—	0.126±0.008	—	7.010606 ±0.00002	0.067	—	2014	
Kepler-142b	Transit	—	0.178±0.035	—	2.024152 ±0.000003	0.032	—	2014	
Kepler-142c	Transit	—	0.255±0.049	—	4.761702 ±0.000005	0.057	—	2014	
Kepler-142d	Transit	—	0.193±0.042	—	41.809118 ±0.000562	0.242	—	2014	
Kepler-143b	Transit	—	0.215±0.054	—	16.007583 ±0.000093	0.127	—	2014	
Kepler-143c	Transit	—	0.301±0.075	—	27.082511 ±0.000169	0.181	—	2014	
Kepler-144b	Transit	—	0.119±0.023	—	5.885273 ±0.00002	0.066	—	2013	
Kepler-144c	Transit	—	0.12±0.023	—	10.104665 ±0.000043	0.094	—	2013	
Kepler-145b	Transit	0.117±0.036	0.236±0.007	—	22.951	—	—	2014	
Kepler-145c	Transit	0.25±0.052	0.385±0.011	—	42.882	—	—	2014	
Kepler-146b	Transit	—	0.331±0.062	—	31.158799 ±0.000079	0.2	—	2014	
Kepler-146c	Transit	—	0.279±0.053	—	76.732171 ±0.000609	0.364	—	2014	
Kepler-147b	Transit	—	0.136±0.028	—	12.610584 ±0.000228	0.113	—	2014	
Kepler-147c	Transit	—	0.217±0.044	—	33.416423 ±0.000416	0.216	—	2014	
Kepler-148b	Transit	—	0.161±0.078	—	1.729366 ±0.000004	0.028	—	2016	
Kepler-148c	Transit	—	0.321±0.157	—	4.180043 ±0.000004	0.05	—	2014	
Kepler-148d	Transit	—	0.774+0.046 −0.037	—	51.84688575 ±0.0000257	—	—	2014	
Kepler-149b	Transit	—	0.376±0.054	—	29.198943 ±0.000041	0.184	—	2014	
Kepler-149c	Transit	—	0.144±0.021	—	55.328328 ±0.001946	0.281	—	2014	
Kepler-149d	Transit	—	0.353±0.061	—	160.018032 ±0.001096	0.571	—	2014	
Kepler-150b	Transit	—	0.112±0.017	—	3.428054 ±0.000026	0.044	—	2014	
Kepler-150c	Transit	—	0.329±0.053	—	7.381998 ±0.00001	0.073	—	2014	
Kepler-150d	Transit	—	0.249±0.037	—	12.56093 ±0.000036	0.104	—	2014	
Kepler-150e	Transit	—	0.278±0.049	—	30.826557 ±0.000199	0.189	—	2014	
Kepler-150f	Transit	—	0.325+0.046 −0.035	—	637.2093 ±0.0169	1.24+0.29 −0.45	—	2014	
Kepler-151b	Transit	—	0.273±0.136	—	15.228958 ±0.00003	0.116	—	2014	
Kepler-151c	Transit	—	0.186±0.093	—	24.674612 ±0.000106	0.16	—	2014	
Kepler-152b	Transit	—	0.249±0.015	—	18.207973 ±0.000023	0.124	—	2014	
Kepler-152c	Transit	—	0.213±0.014	—	88.255055 ±0.000309	0.356	—	2014	
Kepler-153b	Transit	—	0.261±0.157	—	18.870227 ±0.000039	0.129	—	2014	
Kepler-153c	Transit	—	0.226±0.136	—	46.90232 ±0.000215	0.237	—	2016	
Kepler-154b	Transit	—	0.202±0.039	—	33.040532 ±0.000215	0.198	—	2016	
Kepler-154c	Transit	—	0.263±0.055	—	62.303276 ±0.000406	0.303	—	2014	
Kepler-154d	Transit	—	0.343+0.029 −0.021	—	20.54981883 ±0.00002572	—	—	2014	
Kepler-154e	Transit	—	0.134+0.012 −0.011	—	3.93276465 ±0.00001225	—	—	2014	
Kepler-154f	Transit	—	0.134+0.03 −0.019	—	9.91935684 ±0.00007788	—	—	2014	
Kepler-155b	Transit	—	0.186±0.019	—	5.931194 ±0.000008	0.056	—	2014	
Kepler-155c	Transit	—	0.2±0.013	—	52.661793 ±0.000236	0.242	—	2014	
Kepler-156b	Transit	—	0.205±0.015	—	4.973456 ±0.000008	0.054	—	2016	
Kepler-156c	Transit	—	0.227±0.017	—	15.906801 ±0.000045	0.117	—	2014	
Kepler-157b	Transit	—	0.118±0.023	—	1.732342 ±0.000006	0.028	—	2014	
Kepler-157c	Transit	—	0.2±0.038	—	13.5405 ±0.000049	0.11	—	2014	
Kepler-157d	Transit	—	0.13+0.014 −0.009	—	7.02573474 ±0.00002388	—	—	2014	
Kepler-158b	Transit	—	0.189±0.032	—	16.709184 ±0.000064	0.111	—	2014	
Kepler-158c	Transit	—	0.17±0.027	—	28.551383 ±0.00014	0.158	—	2014	
Kepler-158d	Transit	—	0.038±0.004	—	0.645088±0.000002	—	—	2024	
Kepler-159b	Transit	—	0.212±0.016	—	10.139623 ±0.000022	0.082	—	2014	
Kepler-159c	Transit	—	0.304±0.025	—	43.595792 ±0.000125	0.218	—	2014	
Kepler-160b	Transit	—	0.137±0.068	—	4.309427 ±0.000017	0.05	—	2014	
Kepler-160c	Transit	—	0.322±0.158	—	13.699087 ±0.000031	0.109	—	2014	
Kepler-161b	Transit	—	0.189±0.012	—	4.921355 ±0.000006	0.054	—	2014	
Kepler-161c	Transit	—	0.183±0.013	—	7.06424 ±0.000011	0.068	—	2014	
Kepler-162b	Transit	—	0.112±0.06	—	6.919798 ±0.000052	0.069	—	2014	
Kepler-162c	Transit	—	0.27±0.145	—	19.446355 ±0.000045	0.137	—	2014	
Kepler-163b	Transit	—	0.094±0.039	—	7.810937 ±0.000107	0.078	—	2014	
Kepler-163c	Transit	—	0.202±0.084	—	21.347262 ±0.000081	0.152	—	2014	
Kepler-164b	Transit	—	0.126±0.025	—	5.03503 ±0.000027	0.058	—	2014	
Kepler-164c	Transit	—	0.244±0.046	—	10.945723 ±0.000029	0.097	—	2014	
Kepler-164d	Transit	—	0.219±0.042	—	28.986769 ±0.000162	0.187	—	2014	
Kepler-165b	Transit	—	0.207±0.126	—	8.180848 ±0.000026	0.072	—	2016	
Kepler-165c	Transit	—	0.199±0.12	—	15.31299 ±0.000057	0.11	—	2014	
Kepler-166b	Transit	—	0.203±0.104	—	7.650254 ±0.000012	0.072	—	2014	
Kepler-166c	Transit	—	0.212±0.11	—	34.260281 ±0.000124	0.195	—	2016	
Kepler-166d	Transit	—	0.154+0.013 −0.009	—	1.55400393 ±0.00000144	—	—	2016	
Kepler-167b	Transit	—	0.144±0.004	—	4.3931632 ±0.0000046	0.0483+0.0017 −0.0025	0	2014	
Kepler-167c	Transit	—	0.138±0.004	—	7.406114 ±0.000012	0.0684+0.024 −0.0035	0	2014	
Kepler-167d	Transit	—	0.107±0.004	—	21.803855 ±0.000078	0.1405+0.005 −0.0071	0.12	2014	
Kepler-167e	Transit	—	0.906±0.021	—	1071.23228 ±0.00056	1.89+0.058 −0.067	0.062+0.104 −0.043	2014	
Kepler-168b	Transit	—	0.13±0.059	—	4.425391 ±0.000033	0.056	—	2014	
Kepler-168c	Transit	—	0.24±0.108	—	13.193242 ±0.000049	0.116	—	2014	
Kepler-169b	Transit	—	0.101±0.007	—	3.250619 ±0.000013	0.04	—	2014	
Kepler-169c	Transit	—	0.108±0.007	—	6.195469 ±0.000029	0.062	—	2014	
Kepler-169d	Transit	—	0.112±0.008	—	8.348125 ±0.000041	0.075	—	2014	
Kepler-169e	Transit	—	0.196±0.026	—	13.767102 ±0.000034	0.105	—	2014	
Kepler-169f	Transit	—	0.23±0.021	—	87.090195 ±0.000406	0.359	—	2014	
Kepler-170b	Transit	—	0.285±0.02	—	7.930592 ±0.000014	0.08	—	2014	
Kepler-170c	Transit	—	0.255±0.015	—	16.665863 ±0.000053	0.131	—	2014	
Kepler-171b	Transit	—	0.209±0.094	—	4.166972 ±0.000007	0.05	—	2014	
Kepler-171c	Transit	—	0.228±0.103	—	11.463462 ±0.000026	0.098	—	2014	
Kepler-171d	Transit	—	0.169±0.08	—	39.595519 ±0.000699	0.223	—	2014	
Kepler-172b	Transit	—	0.21±0.037	—	2.940309 ±0.000007	0.04	—	2014	
Kepler-172c	Transit	—	0.255±0.047	—	6.388996 ±0.00002	0.068	—	2014	
Kepler-172d	Transit	—	0.201±0.036	—	14.627119 ±0.000105	0.118	—	2014	
Kepler-172e	Transit	—	0.246±0.05	—	35.118736 ±0.000253	0.211	—	2014	
Kepler-173b	Transit	—	0.115±0.057	—	4.263742 ±0.000021	0.048	—	2014	
Kepler-173c	Transit	—	0.217±0.108	—	8.005777 ±0.000015	0.074	—	2014	
Kepler-174b	Transit	—	0.175±0.01	—	13.98179 ±0.000024	0.1	—	2014	
Kepler-174c	Transit	—	0.133±0.008	—	44.000529 ±0.000265	0.214	—	2014	
Kepler-174d	Transit	—	0.195±0.012	—	247.35373 ±0.002001	0.677	—	2014	
Kepler-175b	Transit	—	0.228±0.114	—	11.903515 ±0.000046	0.105	—	2014	
Kepler-175c	Transit	—	0.277±0.139	—	34.035257 ±0.000279	0.213	—	2016	
Kepler-176b	Transit	—	0.128±0.065	—	5.433074 ±0.000024	0.058	—	2013	
Kepler-176c	Transit	—	0.232±0.119	—	12.759712 ±0.000033	0.102	—	2013	
Kepler-176d	Transit	—	0.224±0.118	—	25.751974 ±0.000115	0.163	—	2014	
Kepler-176e	Transit	—	0.129+0.011 −0.013	—	51.16579 ±0.0006432	—	—	2014	
Kepler-177b	Transit	0.006+0.002 −0.001	0.259+0.136 −0.027	—	36.855	—	—	2014	
Kepler-177c	Transit	0.024+0.011 −0.01	0.633+0.331 −0.064	—	49.412	—	—	2014	
Kepler-178b	Transit	—	0.259±0.112	—	9.576694 ±0.000021	0.085	—	2014	
Kepler-178c	Transit	—	0.257±0.11	—	20.552802 ±0.000066	0.142	—	2014	
Kepler-178d	Transit	—	0.352±0.152	—	96.678988 ±0.000702	0.397	—	2014	
Kepler-179b	Transit	—	0.146±0.061	—	2.735926 ±0.000008	0.036	—	2014	
Kepler-179c	Transit	—	0.178±0.072	—	6.40013 ±0.000017	0.064	—	2014	
Kepler-180b	Transit	—	0.134±0.06	—	13.817124 ±0.000155	0.109	—	2014	
Kepler-180c	Transit	—	0.269±0.12	—	41.885775 ±0.000228	0.229	—	2014	
Kepler-181b	Transit	—	0.113±0.055	—	3.137873 ±0.000013	0.04	—	2014	
Kepler-181c	Transit	—	0.178±0.087	—	4.302149 ±0.000008	0.049	—	2014	
Kepler-182b	Transit	—	0.23±0.105	—	9.825792 ±0.000062	0.096	—	2014	
Kepler-182c	Transit	—	0.306±0.136	—	20.684342 ±0.000097	0.157	—	2014	
Kepler-183b	Transit	—	0.184±0.079	—	5.687945 ±0.00002	0.064	—	2014	
Kepler-183c	Transit	—	0.203±0.087	—	11.637071 ±0.000055	0.103	—	2014	
Kepler-184b	Transit	—	0.211±0.119	—	10.687576 ±0.000025	0.092	—	2014	
Kepler-184c	Transit	—	0.176±0.099	—	20.303005 ±0.000087	0.141	—	2014	
Kepler-184d	Transit	—	0.222±0.126	—	29.022358 ±0.000176	0.179	—	2014	
Kepler-185b	Transit	—	0.104±0.06	—	1.6329 ±0.000005	0.026	—	2014	
Kepler-185c	Transit	—	0.18±0.104	—	20.729042 ±0.000097	0.139	—	2014	
Kepler-186b	Transit	—	0.095±0.011	—	3.8867907 ±0.0000062	0.0343±0.0046	—	2014	
Kepler-186c	Transit	—	0.112±0.012	—	7.267302 ±0.000012	0.0451±0.007	—	2014	
Kepler-186d	Transit	—	0.125±0.014	—	13.342996 ±0.000025	0.0781±0.01	—	2014	
Kepler-186e	Transit	—	0.113+0.013 −0.012	—	22.407704 ±0.000074	0.11±0.015	—	2014	
Kepler-186f	Transit	—	0.104±0.007	—	129.9441 ±0.0013	0.432+0.171 −0.053	0.04+0.07 −0.04	2014	
Kepler-187b	Transit	—	0.126±0.025	—	4.938864 ±0.000058	0.059	—	2014	
Kepler-187c	Transit	—	0.238±0.046	—	10.640263 ±0.000048	0.099	—	2014	
Kepler-188b	Transit	—	0.15±0.068	—	2.061897 ±0.00001	0.032	—	2014	
Kepler-188c	Transit	—	0.285±0.129	—	5.996553 ±0.000015	0.066	—	2014	
Kepler-189b	Transit	—	0.108±0.054	—	10.399931 ±0.000085	0.088	—	2014	
Kepler-189c	Transit	—	0.212±0.106	—	20.134866 ±0.000057	0.137	—	2014	
Kepler-190b	Transit	—	0.139±0.01	—	2.019999 ±0.000003	0.03	—	2016	
Kepler-190c	Transit	—	0.13±0.009	—	3.763024 ±0.000009	0.045	—	2014	
Kepler-191b	Transit	—	0.12±0.059	—	9.939632 ±0.000066	0.087	—	2014	
Kepler-191c	Transit	—	0.166±0.082	—	17.738506 ±0.000082	0.128	—	2016	
Kepler-191d	Transit	—	0.203+0.014 −0.012	—	5.94504102 ±0.00000763	—	—	2014	
Kepler-192b	Transit	—	0.244±0.04	—	9.926746 ±0.000018	0.09	—	2014	
Kepler-192c	Transit	—	0.249±0.046	—	21.2234 ±0.000076	0.15	—	2014	
Kepler-192d	Transit	—	0.091+0.009 −0.006	—	6.47027579 ±0.0000432	—	—	2014	
Kepler-193b	Transit	—	0.213±0.096	—	11.38848 ±0.000054	0.106	—	2014	
Kepler-193c	Transit	—	0.245±0.111	—	50.697494 ±0.000446	0.286	—	2014	
Kepler-194b	Transit	—	0.135±0.07	—	2.092281 ±0.000008	0.032	—	2014	
Kepler-194c	Transit	—	0.231±0.121	—	17.308032 ±0.000079	0.131	—	2014	
Kepler-194d	Transit	—	0.214±0.112	—	52.814973 ±0.000481	0.275	—	2014	
Kepler-195b	Transit	—	0.181±0.066	—	8.307872 ±0.00002	0.077	—	2014	
Kepler-195c	Transit	—	0.138±0.051	—	34.096863 ±0.000371	0.197	—	2014	
Kepler-196b	Transit	—	0.17±0.013	—	20.739886 ±0.000066	0.138	—	2014	
Kepler-196c	Transit	—	0.2±0.015	—	47.427737 ±0.000223	0.24	—	2014	
Kepler-197b	Transit	—	0.091±0.004	—	5.599308 ±0.000023	0.06	—	2014	
Kepler-197c	Transit	—	0.11±0.004	—	10.349695 ±0.000045	0.09	—	2014	
Kepler-197d	Transit	—	0.109±0.009	—	15.677563 ±0.000096	0.119	—	2016	
Kepler-197e	Transit	—	0.081±0.004	—	25.209715 ±0.000387	0.164	—	2014	
Kepler-198b	Transit	—	0.252±0.037	—	17.790037 ±0.000035	0.131	—	2014	
Kepler-198c	Transit	—	0.22±0.033	—	49.567416 ±0.00022	0.259	—	2014	
Kepler-198d	Transit	—	0.136+0.008 −0.006	—	1.31184443 ±0.00000133	—	—	2014	
Kepler-199b	Transit	—	0.277±0.05	—	23.637604 ±0.00005	0.158	—	2014	
Kepler-199c	Transit	—	0.29±0.052	—	67.093408 ±0.00019	0.316	—	2014	
Kepler-200b	Transit	—	0.19±0.037	—	8.594805 ±0.000036	0.08	—	2014	
Kepler-200c	Transit	—	0.142±0.026	—	10.222157 ±0.000053	0.09	—	2014	
Kepler-201b	Transit	—	0.219±0.043	—	25.672083 ±0.000075	0.175	—	2014	
Kepler-201c	Transit	—	0.254±0.054	—	151.884058 ±0.002014	0.573	—	2014	
Kepler-202b	Transit	—	0.145±0.009	—	4.069427 ±0.000007	0.045	—	2014	
Kepler-202c	Transit	—	0.165±0.009	—	16.282493 ±0.000038	0.113	—	2014	
Kepler-203b	Transit	—	0.229±0.046	—	3.162697 ±0.000004	0.043	—	2014	
Kepler-203c	Transit	—	0.22±0.042	—	5.370647 ±0.000008	0.061	—	2014	
Kepler-203d	Transit	—	0.128±0.025	—	11.32972 ±0.00008	0.1	—	2014	
Kepler-204b	Transit	—	0.226±0.048	—	14.400974 ±0.000056	0.117	—	2014	
Kepler-204c	Transit	—	0.16±0.035	—	25.660593 ±0.000288	0.173	—	2014	
Kepler-205b	Transit	—	0.135±0.012	—	2.75564 ±0.000002	0.032	—	2014	
Kepler-205c	Transit	—	0.146±0.011	—	20.306546 ±0.000038	0.122	—	2014	
Kepler-206b	Transit	—	0.107±0.021	—	7.781987 ±0.000058	0.078	—	2014	
Kepler-206c	Transit	—	0.158±0.03	—	13.137471 ±0.000065	0.111	—	2014	
Kepler-206d	Transit	—	0.106±0.021	—	23.44281 ±0.000453	0.163	—	2014	
Kepler-207b	Transit	—	0.14±0.027	—	1.611865 ±0.000006	0.029	—	2014	
Kepler-207c	Transit	—	0.134±0.026	—	3.071571 ±0.000016	0.044	—	2014	
Kepler-207d	Transit	—	0.295±0.056	—	5.868075 ±0.000009	0.068	—	2014	
Kepler-208b	Transit	—	0.145±0.027	—	4.22864 ±0.000018	0.054	—	2014	
Kepler-208c	Transit	—	0.124±0.023	—	7.466623 ±0.000067	0.079	—	2014	
Kepler-208d	Transit	—	0.107±0.021	—	11.131786 ±0.000131	0.103	—	2014	
Kepler-208e	Transit	—	0.132±0.025	—	16.259458 ±0.000176	0.132	—	2014	
Kepler-209b	Transit	—	0.202±0.03	—	16.087845 ±0.000041	0.122	—	2014	
Kepler-209c	Transit	—	0.277±0.045	—	41.749882 ±0.000106	0.231	—	2014	
Kepler-210b	Transit	—	0.262±0.019	—	2.453234 ±0.000001	0.032	—	2014	
Kepler-210c	Transit	—	0.323±0.017	—	7.972513 ±0.000003	0.07	—	2014	
Kepler-211b	Transit	—	0.112±0.008	—	4.138575 ±0.00001	0.048	—	2014	
Kepler-211c	Transit	—	0.115±0.008	—	6.04045 ±0.000016	0.062	—	2014	
Kepler-212b	Transit	—	0.097±0.019	—	16.257582 ±0.000378	0.133	—	2014	
Kepler-212c	Transit	—	0.244±0.045	—	31.805174 ±0.000142	0.207	—	2014	
Kepler-213b	Transit	—	0.145±0.028	—	2.46236 ±0.000006	0.036	—	2014	
Kepler-213c	Transit	—	0.209±0.04	—	4.822962 ±0.000008	0.057	—	2014	
Kepler-214b	Transit	—	0.233±0.044	—	15.660544 ±0.00008	0.13	—	2014	
Kepler-214c	Transit	—	0.19±0.036	—	28.7798 ±0.000397	0.194	—	2014	
Kepler-215b	Transit	—	0.145±0.036	—	9.360672 ±0.00004	0.084	—	2014	
Kepler-215c	Transit	—	0.158±0.037	—	14.667108 ±0.000089	0.113	—	2014	
Kepler-215d	Transit	—	0.213±0.049	—	30.864423 ±0.000092	0.185	—	2014	
Kepler-215e	Transit	—	0.156±0.037	—	68.16101 ±0.00063	0.314	—	2014	
Kepler-216b	Transit	—	0.21±0.041	—	7.693641 ±0.000031	0.079	—	2016	
Kepler-216c	Transit	—	0.271±0.053	—	17.406669 ±0.000057	0.136	—	2014	
Kepler-217b	Transit	—	0.199±0.029	—	5.374943 ±0.000019	0.065	—	2014	
Kepler-217c	Transit	—	0.165±0.024	—	8.586004 ±0.000053	0.089	—	2016	
Kepler-217d	Transit	—	0.118+0.032 −0.024	—	3.88689525 ±0.00002241	—	—	2014	
Kepler-218b	Transit	—	0.132±0.011	—	3.619337 ±0.000011	0.046	—	2014	
Kepler-218c	Transit	—	0.28±0.023	—	44.699576 ±0.000167	0.248	—	2014	
Kepler-218d	Transit	—	0.237+0.025 −0.016	—	124.5244647 ±0.0005822	—	—	2014	
Kepler-219b	Transit	—	0.263±0.044	—	4.585512 ±0.000008	0.057	—	2014	
Kepler-219c	Transit	—	0.319±0.054	—	22.714613 ±0.000075	0.165	—	2014	
Kepler-219d	Transit	—	0.251±0.043	—	47.903645 ±0.000307	0.272	—	2014	
Kepler-220b	Transit	—	0.072±0.004	—	4.159807 ±0.00001	0.046	—	2014	
Kepler-220c	Transit	—	0.14±0.008	—	9.034199 ±0.000009	0.076	—	2014	
Kepler-220d	Transit	—	0.087±0.005	—	28.122397 ±0.000162	0.163	—	2014	
Kepler-220e	Transit	—	0.119±0.011	—	45.902733 ±0.000192	0.226	—	2014	
Kepler-221b	Transit	—	0.153±0.015	—	2.795906 ±0.000004	0.037	—	2014	
Kepler-221c	Transit	—	0.261±0.024	—	5.690586 ±0.000004	0.059	—	2014	
Kepler-221d	Transit	—	0.244±0.022	—	10.04156 ±0.000011	0.087	—	2014	
Kepler-221e	Transit	—	0.235±0.022	—	18.369917 ±0.000029	0.13	—	2014	
Kepler-222b	Transit	—	0.282±0.125	—	3.936981 ±0.000005	0.048	—	2014	
Kepler-222c	Transit	—	0.414±0.185	—	10.08881 ±0.000011	0.091	—	2014	
Kepler-222d	Transit	—	0.329±0.145	—	28.081912 ±0.000069	0.18	—	2014	
Kepler-223b	Transit	0.02328+0.00409 −0.00346	0.267+0.016 −0.024	1.54+0.63 −0.35	7.38449 ±0.00022	—	0.078+0.015 −0.017	2014	
Kepler-223c	Transit	0.01605+0.00535 −0.00346	0.307+0.018 −0.027	0.71+0.33 −0.2	9.84564 ±0.00052	—	0.15+0.019 −0.051	2014	
Kepler-223d	Transit	0.02517+0.00472 −0.00409	0.467+0.023 −0.04	0.31+0.12 −0.07	14.78869 ±0.0003	—	0.037+0.018 −0.017	2014	
Kepler-223e	Transit	0.0151+0.0044 −0.00378	0.41+0.024 −0.037	0.28+0.12 −0.08	19.72567 ±0.00055	—	0.051±0.019	2014	
Kepler-224b	Transit	—	0.124±0.008	—	3.132924 ±0.000014	0.038	—	2014	
Kepler-224c	Transit	—	0.278±0.023	—	5.925003 ±0.00001	0.058	—	2014	
Kepler-224d	Transit	—	0.205±0.012	—	11.349393 ±0.000034	0.089	—	2014	
Kepler-224e	Transit	—	0.176±0.013	—	18.643577 ±0.000087	0.124	—	2014	
Kepler-225b	Transit	—	0.107±0.006	—	6.738975 ±0.000041	0.056	—	2014	
Kepler-225c	Transit	—	0.164±0.009	—	18.794234 ±0.000076	0.111	—	2014	
Kepler-226b	Transit	—	0.138±0.055	—	3.940997 ±0.00002	0.047	—	2014	
Kepler-226c	Transit	—	0.203±0.08	—	5.349555 ±0.000014	0.058	—	2014	
Kepler-226d	Transit	—	0.109±0.044	—	8.109044 ±0.000094	0.076	—	2014	
Kepler-227b	Transit	—	0.277±0.14	—	9.488015 ±0.000039	0.09	—	2014	
Kepler-227c	Transit	—	0.271±0.136	—	54.418694 ±0.00046	0.29	—	2014	
Kepler-228b	Transit	—	0.136±0.063	—	2.566546 ±0.000026	0.038	—	2014	
Kepler-228c	Transit	—	0.241±0.111	—	4.134444 ±0.000018	0.052	—	2014	
Kepler-228d	Transit	—	0.36±0.165	—	11.094286 ±0.000036	0.101	—	2014	
Kepler-229b	Transit	—	0.196±0.07	—	6.252972 ±0.000021	0.062	—	2014	
Kepler-229c	Transit	—	0.439±0.155	—	16.068638 ±0.000019	0.117	—	2014	
Kepler-229d	Transit	—	0.343±0.123	—	41.194912 ±0.000248	0.22	—	2014	
Kepler-230b	Transit	—	0.38±0.194	—	32.625555 ±0.000126	0.191	—	2014	
Kepler-230c	Transit	—	0.182±0.093	—	91.773242 ±0.001618	0.38	—	2014	
Kepler-231b	Transit	—	0.154±0.011	—	10.065275 ±0.000027	0.074	—	2014	
Kepler-231c	Transit	—	0.172±0.017	—	19.271566 ±0.000099	0.114	—	2014	
Kepler-232b	Transit	—	0.275±0.131	—	4.431222 ±0.000011	0.054	—	2014	
Kepler-232c	Transit	—	0.342±0.166	—	11.379349 ±0.000044	0.101	—	2014	
Kepler-233b	Transit	—	0.217±0.059	—	8.472382 ±0.000026	0.077	—	2014	
Kepler-233c	Transit	—	0.242±0.07	—	60.418955 ±0.00063	0.287	—	2014	
Kepler-234b	Transit	—	0.33±0.148	—	2.711506 ±0.000006	0.04	—	2014	
Kepler-234c	Transit	—	0.313±0.139	—	7.21205 ±0.000022	0.077	—	2014	
Kepler-235b	Transit	—	0.199±0.009	—	3.340222 ±0.000005	0.037	—	2014	
Kepler-235c	Transit	—	0.114±0.007	—	7.824904 ±0.000055	0.065	—	2014	
Kepler-235d	Transit	—	0.183±0.009	—	20.060548 ±0.000099	0.122	—	2014	
Kepler-235e	Transit	—	0.198±0.026	—	46.183669 ±0.000425	0.213	—	2014	
Kepler-236b	Transit	—	0.14±0.011	—	8.295611 ±0.000032	0.065	—	2014	
Kepler-236c	Transit	—	0.178±0.015	—	23.968127 ±0.000174	0.132	—	2014	
Kepler-237b	Transit	—	0.126±0.067	—	4.715106 ±0.00003	0.05	—	2014	
Kepler-237c	Transit	—	0.186±0.098	—	8.103636 ±0.000032	0.071	—	2013	
Kepler-238b	Transit	—	0.154±0.036	—	2.090876 ±0.00002	0.034	—	2013	
Kepler-238c	Transit	—	0.213±0.04	—	6.155557 ±0.00005	0.069	—	2014	
Kepler-238d	Transit	—	0.274±0.051	—	13.233549 ±0.000081	0.115	—	2014	
Kepler-238e	Transit	0.534+0.226 −0.217	0.5+0.211 −0.041	—	23.654	—	—	2014	
Kepler-238f	Transit	0.042+0.009 −0.008	0.178+0.076 −0.015	—	50.447	—	—	2014	
Kepler-239b	Transit	—	0.208±0.013	—	11.763051 ±0.000034	0.095	—	2014	
Kepler-239c	Transit	—	0.224±0.037	—	56.228098 ±0.00058	0.268	—	2014	
Kepler-240b	Transit	—	0.122±0.05	—	4.144495 ±0.000026	0.048	—	2014	
Kepler-240c	Transit	—	0.196±0.079	—	7.953528 ±0.000025	0.074	—	2014	
Kepler-241b	Transit	—	0.208±0.092	—	12.718092 ±0.000035	0.094	—	2014	
Kepler-241c	Transit	—	0.229±0.099	—	36.065978 ±0.000133	0.189	—	2014	
Kepler-242b	Transit	—	0.233±0.143	—	8.20395 ±0.00002	0.075	—	2014	
Kepler-242c	Transit	—	0.178±0.11	—	14.496481 ±0.000083	0.109	—	2014	
Kepler-243b	Transit	—	0.219±0.103	—	5.715442 ±0.000011	0.062	—	2014	
Kepler-243c	Transit	—	0.178±0.087	—	20.026218 ±0.000163	0.142	—	2014	
Kepler-244b	Transit	—	0.246±0.103	—	4.311792 ±0.000008	0.05	—	2014	
Kepler-244c	Transit	—	0.183±0.078	—	9.767292 ±0.000046	0.087	—	2014	
Kepler-244d	Transit	—	0.206±0.087	—	20.050401 ±0.00013	0.14	—	2016	
Kepler-245b	Transit	—	0.229±0.016	—	7.49019 ±0.000019	0.071	—	2014	
Kepler-245c	Transit	—	0.194±0.015	—	17.460812 ±0.000076	0.124	—	2014	
Kepler-245d	Transit	—	0.27±0.019	—	36.277108 ±0.000173	0.202	—	2014	
Kepler-245e	Transit	—	0.156+0.007 −0.005	—	3.21982106 ±0.00000474	—	—	2014	
Kepler-246b	Transit	—	0.209±0.107	—	4.60182 ±0.000008	0.052	—	2014	
Kepler-246c	Transit	—	0.134±0.068	—	11.187161 ±0.000075	0.095	—	2014	
Kepler-247b	Transit	—	0.146±0.041	—	3.33616 ±0.000007	0.042	—	2014	
Kepler-247c	Transit	—	0.365±0.102	—	9.439452 ±0.000007	0.084	—	2014	
Kepler-247d	Transit	—	0.352±0.098	—	20.477912 ±0.000026	0.14	—	2014	
Kepler-248b	Transit	—	0.269±0.032	—	6.308205 ±0.00001	0.066	—	2014	
Kepler-248c	Transit	—	0.363±0.044	—	16.239494 ±0.000024	0.123	—	2014	
Kepler-249b	Transit	—	0.097±0.004	—	3.306539 ±0.00001	0.035	—	2014	
Kepler-249c	Transit	—	0.135±0.008	—	7.113702 ±0.000018	0.058	—	2014	
Kepler-249d	Transit	—	0.14±0.012	—	15.368459 ±0.00007	0.097	—	2014	
Kepler-250b	Transit	—	0.101±0.061	—	4.148141 ±0.000046	0.048	—	2014	
Kepler-250c	Transit	—	0.203±0.117	—	7.156804 ±0.000022	0.069	—	2014	
Kepler-250d	Transit	—	0.194±0.112	—	17.648312 ±0.000081	0.127	—	2014	
Kepler-251b	Transit	—	0.119±0.021	—	4.790936 ±0.000037	0.053	—	2014	
Kepler-251c	Transit	—	0.247±0.044	—	16.514043 ±0.000054	0.122	—	2014	
Kepler-251d	Transit	—	0.247±0.044	—	30.133001 ±0.000161	0.182	—	2014	
Kepler-251e	Transit	—	0.247±0.044	—	99.640161 ±0.001074	0.404	—	2014	
Kepler-252b	Transit	—	0.11±0.011	—	6.668391 ±0.000031	0.058	—	2014	
Kepler-252c	Transit	—	0.192±0.012	—	10.848463 ±0.000015	0.08	—	2014	
Kepler-253b	Transit	—	0.145±0.06	—	3.783986 ±0.000017	0.046	—	2014	
Kepler-253c	Transit	—	0.236±0.099	—	10.281951 ±0.000032	0.089	—	2014	
Kepler-253d	Transit	—	0.283±0.116	—	18.119869 ±0.000066	0.13	—	2014	
Kepler-254b	Transit	—	0.345±0.165	—	5.826662 ±0.00001	0.064	—	2014	
Kepler-254c	Transit	—	0.192±0.092	—	12.412183 ±0.000082	0.105	—	2016	
Kepler-254d	Transit	—	0.223±0.106	—	18.746477 ±0.000121	0.139	—	2014	
Kepler-255b	Transit	—	0.138±0.055	—	5.714606 ±0.000052	0.063	—	2014	
Kepler-255c	Transit	—	0.267±0.105	—	9.946047 ±0.000035	0.092	—	2014	
Kepler-255d	Transit	—	0.118+0.012 −0.009	—	1.04562266 ±0.00000267	—	—	2014	
Kepler-256b	Transit	—	0.142±0.035	—	1.620493 ±0.000009	0.027	—	2014	
Kepler-256c	Transit	—	0.192±0.047	—	3.38802 ±0.000016	0.045	—	2014	
Kepler-256d	Transit	—	0.221±0.056	—	5.839172 ±0.000031	0.064	—	2014	
Kepler-256e	Transit	—	0.21±0.052	—	10.681572 ±0.000066	0.096	—	2014	
Kepler-257b	Transit	—	0.233±0.117	—	2.382667 ±0.000006	0.034	—	2014	
Kepler-257c	Transit	—	0.483±0.243	—	6.581484 ±0.000008	0.066	—	2014	
Kepler-257d	Transit	—	0.442±0.221	—	24.664551 ±0.000051	0.16	—	2014	
Kepler-258b	Transit	—	0.362±0.242	—	13.19722 ±0.000019	0.103	—	2014	
Kepler-258c	Transit	—	0.322±0.217	—	33.653079 ±0.000189	0.193	—	2014	
Kepler-259b	Transit	—	0.25±0.122	—	8.115317 ±0.000022	0.079	—	2014	
Kepler-259c	Transit	—	0.241±0.117	—	36.924931 ±0.000181	0.217	—	2014	
Kepler-260b	Transit	—	0.179±0.049	—	8.187399 ±0.000022	0.075	—	2014	
Kepler-260c	Transit	—	0.155±0.048	—	76.050178 ±0.001026	0.332	—	2014	
Kepler-261b	Transit	—	0.194±0.012	—	10.381227 ±0.000016	0.088	—	2014	
Kepler-261c	Transit	—	0.178±0.012	—	24.570858 ±0.000069	0.156	—	2014	
Kepler-262b	Transit	—	0.121±0.053	—	13.060855 ±0.000164	0.108	—	2014	
Kepler-262c	Transit	—	0.146±0.061	—	21.853722 ±0.000187	0.152	—	2014	
Kepler-263b	Transit	—	0.238±0.129	—	16.568087 ±0.000065	0.12	—	2014	
Kepler-263c	Transit	—	0.22±0.12	—	47.332773 ±0.000456	0.242	—	2014	
Kepler-264b	Transit	—	0.297±0.066	—	40.806231 ±0.000538	0.249	—	2014	
Kepler-264c	Transit	—	0.252±0.052	—	140.101261 ±0.003678	0.566	—	2014	
Kepler-265b	Transit	—	0.166±0.04	—	6.846262 ±0.000063	0.069	—	2014	
Kepler-265c	Transit	—	0.235±0.049	—	17.028937 ±0.000136	0.127	—	2014	
Kepler-265d	Transit	—	0.222±0.048	—	43.130617 ±0.000658	0.236	—	2014	
Kepler-265e	Transit	—	0.231±0.049	—	67.831024 ±0.001396	0.319	—	2014	
Kepler-266b	Transit	—	0.221±0.107	—	6.61833 ±0.000048	0.071	—	2014	
Kepler-266c	Transit	—	0.347±0.169	—	107.723601 ±0.001643	0.457	—	2014	
Kepler-267b	Transit	—	0.177±0.008	—	3.353728 ±0.000007	0.037	—	2014	
Kepler-267c	Transit	—	0.19±0.01	—	6.87745 ±0.000016	0.06	—	2014	
Kepler-267d	Transit	—	0.203±0.011	—	28.464515 ±0.00018	0.154	—	2014	
Kepler-268b	Transit	—	0.227±0.042	—	25.934138 ±0.000142	0.18	—	2014	
Kepler-268c	Transit	—	0.302±0.062	—	83.446393 ±0.000761	0.391	—	2014	
Kepler-269b	Transit	—	0.22±0.103	—	5.326718 ±0.000035	0.061	—	2014	
Kepler-269c	Transit	—	0.151±0.071	—	8.127899 ±0.000149	0.081	—	2014	
Kepler-270b	Transit	—	0.179±0.036	—	11.476094 ±0.000071	0.107	—	2016	
Kepler-270c	Transit	—	0.158±0.033	—	25.262887 ±0.000599	0.18	—	2014	
Kepler-271b	Transit	—	0.079±0.014	—	5.217738 ±0.000043	0.056	—	2014	
Kepler-271c	Transit	—	0.089±0.016	—	7.410935 ±0.000049	0.071	—	2014	
Kepler-271d	Transit	—	0.059±0.004	—	5.24972541 ±0.00004062	—	—	2014	
Kepler-272b	Transit	—	0.128±0.069	—	2.971353 ±0.000017	0.038	—	2014	
Kepler-272c	Transit	—	0.16±0.086	—	6.057342 ±0.000037	0.061	—	2014	
Kepler-272d	Transit	—	0.201±0.109	—	10.937304 ±0.000073	0.091	—	2014	
Kepler-273b	Transit	—	0.134±0.077	—	2.936532 ±0.000009	0.037	—	2014	
Kepler-273c	Transit	—	0.177±0.103	—	8.014927 ±0.000052	0.073	—	2014	
Kepler-274b	Transit	—	0.137±0.075	—	11.634788 ±0.000134	0.101	—	2014	
Kepler-274c	Transit	—	0.164±0.089	—	33.197861 ±0.000894	0.204	—	2014	
Kepler-275b	Transit	—	0.209±0.04	—	10.300682 ±0.000254	0.098	—	2014	
Kepler-275c	Transit	—	0.302±0.057	—	16.088134 ±0.000164	0.132	—	2013	
Kepler-275d	Transit	—	0.297±0.066	—	35.676062 ±0.000641	0.224	—	2013	
Kepler-276b	Transit	—	0.256±0.12	—	14.12841 ±0.000111	0.119	—	2013	
Kepler-276c	Transit	0.052+0.014 −0.011	0.259+0.113 −0.025	—	31.884	—	—	2014	
Kepler-276d	Transit	0.051+0.016 −0.014	0.25+0.11 −0.024	—	48.648	—	—	2014	
Kepler-277b	Transit	0.275+0.131 −0.126	0.261+0.065 −0.056	—	17.324	—	—	2014	
Kepler-277c	Transit	0.202+0.057 −0.049	0.3+0.074 −0.064	—	33.006	—	—	2013	
Kepler-278b	Transit	—	0.363±0.014	—	30.160546 ±0.000311	0.207	—	2013	
Kepler-278c	Transit	—	0.32±0.038	—	51.078775 ±0.00089	0.294	—	2014	
Kepler-279b	Transit	—	0.323±0.063	—	12.309681 ±0.000051	0.112	—	2014	
Kepler-279c	Transit	0.155+0.023 −0.019	0.384+0.153 −0.037	—	35.736	—	—	2014	
Kepler-279d	Transit	0.118+0.017 −0.014	0.277+0.111 −0.027	—	54.414	—	—	2014	
Kepler-279e	Transit	0.176+0.019 −0.015	—	7.30±3.50	98.3531±0.0018	—	—	2025	
Kepler-280b	Transit	—	0.129±0.062	—	2.139542 ±0.000006	0.032	—	2014	
Kepler-280c	Transit	—	0.179±0.087	—	4.807091 ±0.000009	0.056	—	2014	
Kepler-281b	Transit	—	0.252±0.1	—	14.646008 ±0.000139	0.117	—	2013	
Kepler-281c	Transit	—	0.474±0.184	—	36.337373 ±0.000111	0.215	—	2013	
Kepler-282b	Transit	—	0.09±0.022	—	9.220524 ±0.000341	0.082	—	2014	
Kepler-282c	Transit	—	0.107±0.026	—	13.638723 ±0.000491	0.106	—	2014	
Kepler-282d	Transit	0.192+0.113 −0.114	0.219+0.089 −0.018	—	24.806	—	—	2014	
Kepler-282e	Transit	0.177+0.051 −0.053	0.277+0.112 −0.022	—	44.347	—	—	2014	
Kepler-283b	Transit	—	0.19±0.023	—	11.008151 ±0.000029	0.082	—	2014	
Kepler-283c	Transit	—	0.162±0.011	—	92.743711 ±0.001413	0.341	—	2014	
Kepler-284b	Transit	—	0.2±0.087	—	12.699149 ±0.000071	0.104	—	2014	
Kepler-284c	Transit	—	0.233±0.105	—	37.514456 ±0.00035	0.213	—	2014	
Kepler-285b	Transit	—	0.12±0.052	—	2.633867 ±0.000012	0.036	—	2014	
Kepler-285c	Transit	—	0.1±0.044	—	6.186676 ±0.000059	0.064	—	2014	
Kepler-286b	Transit	—	0.111±0.022	—	1.796302 ±0.000009	0.027	—	2014	
Kepler-286c	Transit	—	0.122±0.024	—	3.468095 ±0.000023	0.042	—	2014	
Kepler-286d	Transit	—	0.119±0.024	—	5.914323 ±0.000054	0.061	—	2014	
Kepler-286e	Transit	—	0.158±0.038	—	29.221289 ±0.00037	0.176	—	2014	
Kepler-287b	Transit	—	0.208±0.095	—	20.342199 ±0.000084	0.145	—	2014	
Kepler-287c	Transit	—	0.291±0.133	—	44.851896 ±0.000247	0.246	—	2014	
Kepler-288b	Transit	—	0.149±0.071	—	6.097326 ±0.000064	0.065	—	2014	
Kepler-288c	Transit	—	0.254±0.121	—	19.305772 ±0.000135	0.14	—	2014	
Kepler-288d	Transit	—	0.238±0.113	—	56.633742 ±0.000908	0.287	—	2014	
Kepler-289b	Transit	0.023±0.021	0.192±0.009	4.1±3.9	34.545 ±0.0005	0.21±0.01	—	2014	
Kepler-289c	Transit	0.42±0.05	1.034±0.017	0.47±0.06	125.8518 ±0.0076	0.51±0.03	—	2014	
Kepler-289d	Transit	0.013±0.003	0.239±0.015	1.2±0.3	66.0634 ±0.0114	0.33±0.02	—	2014	
Kepler-289e	Transit	0.0547+0.0041 −0.0038	—	2.92+0.23 −0.24	330.0716±0.0063	—	—	2025	
Kepler-290b	Transit	—	0.201±0.109	—	14.589347 ±0.000066	0.11	—	2014	
Kepler-290c	Transit	—	0.241±0.124	—	36.77031 ±0.000183	0.205	—	2014	
Kepler-291b	Transit	—	0.193±0.084	—	3.546511 ±0.000016	0.047	—	2014	
Kepler-291c	Transit	—	0.168±0.073	—	5.700786 ±0.000055	0.065	—	2014	
Kepler-292b	Transit	—	0.118±0.012	—	2.580827 ±0.00002	0.035	—	2014	
Kepler-292c	Transit	—	0.131±0.013	—	3.715335 ±0.000033	0.045	—	2014	
Kepler-292d	Transit	—	0.199±0.019	—	7.055679 ±0.000043	0.068	—	2014	
Kepler-292e	Transit	—	0.238±0.031	—	11.97901 ±0.000101	0.097	—	2014	
Kepler-292f	Transit	—	0.21±0.02	—	20.834237 ±0.000184	0.141	—	2014	
Kepler-293b	Transit	—	0.274±0.116	—	19.254196 ±0.000079	0.144	—	2014	
Kepler-293c	Transit	—	0.342±0.145	—	54.155743 ±0.000466	0.286	—	2014	
Kepler-294b	Transit	—	0.158±0.074	—	3.701212 ±0.000025	0.048	—	2014	
Kepler-294c	Transit	—	0.242±0.113	—	6.6264 ±0.000028	0.071	—	2014	
Kepler-295b	Transit	—	0.109±0.057	—	12.645164 ±0.000181	0.099	—	2014	
Kepler-295c	Transit	—	0.104±0.055	—	21.526258 ±0.000336	0.142	—	2014	
Kepler-295d	Transit	—	0.121±0.064	—	33.884054 ±0.000685	0.192	—	2014	
Kepler-296b	Transit	—	0.144+0.026 −0.024	—	10.864384 ±0.000051	0.079±0.013	0.33	2014	
Kepler-296c	Transit	—	0.178±0.029	—	5.8416366 ±0.00001	0.0521+0.0088 −0.0086	0.33	2014	
Kepler-296d	Transit	—	0.186±0.029	—	19.850291 ±0.000061	0.118±0.02	0.33	2014	
Kepler-296e	Transit	—	0.136+0.024 −0.022	—	34.14211 ±0.00025	0.169+0.029 −0.028	0.33	2014	
Kepler-296f	Transit	—	0.161+0.028 −0.027	—	63.33627 ±0.0006	0.255+0.043 −0.042	0.33	2014	
Kepler-297b	Transit	—	0.256±0.046	—	38.871826 ±0.000153	0.217	—	2014	
Kepler-297c	Transit	—	0.583±0.105	—	74.920137 ±0.00012	0.336	—	2014	
Kepler-298b	Transit	—	0.175±0.009	—	10.475464 ±0.000027	0.08	—	2014	
Kepler-298c	Transit	—	0.172±0.02	—	22.92881 ±0.00038	0.136	—	2014	
Kepler-298d	Transit	—	0.223±0.018	—	77.473633 ±0.000615	0.305	—	2014	
Kepler-299b	Transit	—	0.118±0.024	—	2.927128 ±0.000033	0.04	—	2014	
Kepler-299c	Transit	—	0.236±0.056	—	6.885875 ±0.00004	0.07	—	2014	
Kepler-299d	Transit	—	0.166±0.034	—	15.054786 ±0.000189	0.118	—	2014	
Kepler-299e	Transit	—	0.167±0.035	—	38.285489 ±0.001428	0.22	—	2014	
Kepler-300b	Transit	—	0.149±0.068	—	10.446347 ±0.000043	0.094	—	2014	
Kepler-300c	Transit	—	0.201±0.093	—	40.714955 ±0.000245	0.232	—	2014	
Kepler-301b	Transit	—	0.12±0.064	—	2.508553 ±0.000012	0.036	—	2014	
Kepler-301c	Transit	—	0.12±0.064	—	5.419026 ±0.000032	0.06	—	2014	
Kepler-301d	Transit	—	0.156±0.084	—	13.751243 ±0.000081	0.112	—	2014	
Kepler-302b	Transit	—	0.362±0.076	—	30.184104 ±0.000203	0.193	—	2014	
Kepler-302c	Transit	—	1.111±0.227	—	127.282184 ±0.000427	0.503	—	2014	
Kepler-303b	Transit	—	0.079±0.004	—	1.937055 ±0.000004	0.024	—	2014	
Kepler-303c	Transit	—	0.102±0.008	—	7.061149 ±0.000019	0.057	—	2016	
Kepler-304b	Transit	—	0.255±0.019	—	3.295709 ±0.000002	0.039	—	2013	
Kepler-304c	Transit	—	0.194±0.013	—	5.315946 ±0.000007	0.054	—	2013	
Kepler-304d	Transit	—	0.245±0.019	—	9.653471 ±0.000015	0.08	—	2014	
Kepler-304e	Transit	—	0.107+0.005 −0.003	—	1.49914695 ±0.0000028	—	—	2014	
Kepler-305b	Transit	0.033+0.008 −0.006	0.321+0.08 −0.032	—	5.487	—	—	2014	
Kepler-305c	Transit	0.019+0.008 −0.007	0.294+0.073 −0.029	—	8.291	—	—	2014	
Kepler-305d	Transit	—	0.242±0.037	—	16.738661 ±0.000145	0.121	—	2014	
Kepler-306b	Transit	—	0.136±0.009	—	4.646186 ±0.000025	0.05	—	2013	
Kepler-306c	Transit	—	0.21±0.017	—	7.240193 ±0.000032	0.067	—	2013	
Kepler-306d	Transit	—	0.22±0.021	—	17.326644 ±0.000137	0.12	—	2014	
Kepler-306e	Transit	—	0.203±0.013	—	44.840975 ±0.000439	0.227	—	2014	
Kepler-307b	Transit	0.02341+0.00286 −0.00274	0.217±0.008	2.62+0.38 −0.34	10.4208 ±0.0009	—	—	2014	
Kepler-307c	Transit	0.01145+0.00205 −0.00182	0.196±0.006	1.74±0.3	13.0729 ±0.0012	—	—	2014	
Kepler-308b	Transit	—	0.189±0.091	—	9.694928 ±0.00009	0.09	—	2014	
Kepler-308c	Transit	—	0.193±0.093	—	15.38231 ±0.000171	0.123	—	2014	
Kepler-309b	Transit	—	0.139±0.012	—	5.923653 ±0.000028	0.059	—	2014	
Kepler-309c	Transit	—	0.224±0.016	—	105.356383 ±0.000857	0.401	—	2014	
Kepler-310b	Transit	—	0.106±0.05	—	13.930698 ±0.000108	0.111	—	2014	
Kepler-310c	Transit	—	0.302±0.141	—	56.47542 ±0.000207	0.281	—	2014	
Kepler-310d	Transit	—	0.22±0.103	—	92.876125 ±0.000785	0.392	—	2014	
Kepler-311b	Transit	—	0.152±0.029	—	9.176092 ±0.000057	0.087	—	2014	
Kepler-311c	Transit	—	0.128±0.025	—	19.738286 ±0.000205	0.145	—	2014	
Kepler-312b	Transit	—	0.115±0.022	—	1.772419 ±0.000012	0.031	—	2014	
Kepler-312c	Transit	—	0.281±0.054	—	19.747412 ±0.000068	0.153	—	2014	
Kepler-313b	Transit	—	0.226±0.028	—	14.970418 ±0.000114	0.125	—	2014	
Kepler-313c	Transit	—	0.229±0.037	—	32.273273 ±0.000819	0.208	—	2014	
Kepler-314b	Transit	—	0.074±0.011	—	2.461069 ±0.000013	0.035	—	2014	
Kepler-314c	Transit	—	0.259±0.038	—	5.960392 ±0.000005	0.064	—	2014	
Kepler-315b	Transit	—	0.336±0.07	—	96.101141 ±0.000918	0.402	—	2014	
Kepler-315c	Transit	—	0.37±0.086	—	265.469335 ±0.006223	0.791	—	2014	
Kepler-316b	Transit	—	0.095±0.01	—	2.240508 ±0.000006	0.027	—	2014	
Kepler-316c	Transit	—	0.103±0.011	—	6.827766 ±0.000034	0.058	—	2014	
Kepler-317b	Transit	—	0.186±0.086	—	5.524242 ±0.000027	0.061	—	2014	
Kepler-317c	Transit	—	0.153±0.07	—	8.77501 ±0.000113	0.083	—	2014	
Kepler-318b	Transit	—	0.42±0.074	—	4.662715 ±0.000003	0.056	—	2014	
Kepler-318c	Transit	—	0.328±0.058	—	11.815007 ±0.00002	0.105	—	2014	
Kepler-319b	Transit	—	0.145±0.021	—	4.362705 ±0.000009	0.051	—	2014	
Kepler-319c	Transit	—	0.235±0.033	—	6.941357 ±0.000007	0.069	—	2014	
Kepler-319d	Transit	—	0.204±0.031	—	31.781925 ±0.000105	0.191	—	2014	
Kepler-320b	Transit	—	0.102±0.048	—	8.371554 ±0.000162	0.085	—	2014	
Kepler-320c	Transit	—	0.122±0.057	—	17.934937 ±0.000281	0.142	—	2014	
Kepler-321b	Transit	—	0.158±0.03	—	4.915379 ±0.00001	0.057	—	2014	
Kepler-321c	Transit	—	0.207±0.04	—	13.093921 ±0.000024	0.11	—	2014	
Kepler-322b	Transit	—	0.09±0.01	—	1.653888 ±0.000006	0.027	—	2014	
Kepler-322c	Transit	—	0.149±0.016	—	4.337234 ±0.000009	0.051	—	2014	
Kepler-323b	Transit	—	0.128±0.025	—	1.678327 ±0.000003	0.028	—	2014	
Kepler-323c	Transit	—	0.145±0.029	—	3.553822 ±0.000008	0.046	—	2014	
Kepler-324b	Transit	—	0.102±0.01	—	4.385315 ±0.000025	0.05	—	2014	
Kepler-324c	Transit	—	0.281±0.029	—	51.805612 ±0.000314	0.26	—	2014	
Kepler-325b	Transit	—	0.26±0.128	—	4.544439 ±0.000008	0.053	—	2014	
Kepler-325c	Transit	—	0.227±0.112	—	12.762172 ±0.000064	0.105	—	2014	
Kepler-325d	Transit	—	0.249±0.124	—	38.715185 ±0.00022	0.22	—	2014	
Kepler-326b	Transit	—	0.136±0.014	—	2.248329 ±0.000004	0.032	—	2014	
Kepler-326c	Transit	—	0.125±0.009	—	4.580358 ±0.00001	0.051	—	2014	
Kepler-326d	Transit	—	0.108±0.008	—	6.766888 ±0.000023	0.066	—	2013	
Kepler-327b	Transit	—	0.099±0.004	—	2.549575 ±0.000006	0.029	—	2013	
Kepler-327c	Transit	—	0.092±0.004	—	5.212333 ±0.000019	0.047	—	2014	
Kepler-327d	Transit	—	0.154±0.009	—	13.969457 ±0.000031	0.09	—	2014	
Kepler-328b	Transit	0.09+0.041 −0.039	0.205+0.086 −0.021	—	34.921	—	—	2014	
Kepler-328c	Transit	0.124+0.043 −0.04	0.482+0.2 −0.048	—	71.312	—	—	2014	
Kepler-329b	Transit	—	0.125±0.022	—	7.416397 ±0.000046	0.061	—	2014	
Kepler-329c	Transit	—	0.172±0.026	—	18.684737 ±0.000089	0.113	—	2014	
Kepler-330b	Transit	—	0.12±0.047	—	8.25978 ±0.000076	0.075	—	2014	
Kepler-330c	Transit	—	0.174±0.064	—	15.955387 ±0.000076	0.116	—	2014	
Kepler-331b	Transit	—	0.162±0.017	—	8.457496 ±0.000024	0.065	—	2014	
Kepler-331c	Transit	—	0.164±0.017	—	17.28111 ±0.000064	0.105	—	2014	
Kepler-331d	Transit	—	0.146±0.015	—	32.134328 ±0.000216	0.159	—	2014	
Kepler-332b	Transit	—	0.104±0.007	—	7.626324 ±0.000028	0.07	—	2014	
Kepler-332c	Transit	—	0.097±0.007	—	15.995622 ±0.000108	0.114	—	2014	
Kepler-332d	Transit	—	0.105±0.007	—	34.21154 ±0.000326	0.189	—	2014	
Kepler-333b	Transit	—	0.118±0.014	—	12.551158 ±0.000044	0.087	—	2014	
Kepler-333c	Transit	—	0.099±0.018	—	24.08821 ±0.000207	0.135	—	2014	
Kepler-334b	Transit	—	0.1±0.019	—	5.470319 ±0.000021	0.061	—	2014	
Kepler-334c	Transit	—	0.128±0.023	—	12.758005 ±0.000055	0.107	—	2014	
Kepler-334d	Transit	—	0.126±0.023	—	25.09849 ±0.000142	0.168	—	2014	
Kepler-335b	Transit	—	0.302±0.06	—	6.562331 ±0.000031	0.075	—	2014	
Kepler-335c	Transit	—	0.274±0.059	—	67.844469 ±0.001423	0.356	—	2014	
Kepler-336b	Transit	—	0.091±0.017	—	2.024823 ±0.000017	0.033	—	2014	
Kepler-336c	Transit	—	0.187±0.033	—	9.600001 ±0.000035	0.092	—	2014	
Kepler-336d	Transit	—	0.211±0.043	—	20.678772 ±0.000102	0.154	—	2014	
Kepler-337b	Transit	—	0.137±0.038	—	3.292781 ±0.000019	0.045	—	2014	
Kepler-337c	Transit	—	0.183±0.051	—	9.693201 ±0.000047	0.093	—	2014	
Kepler-338b	Transit	—	0.218±0.012	—	13.726976 ±0.000059	0.117	—	2014	
Kepler-338c	Transit	—	0.209±0.011	—	24.310856 ±0.000158	0.172	—	2014	
Kepler-338d	Transit	—	0.268±0.025	—	44.431014 ±0.000368	0.257	—	2014	
Kepler-338e	Transit Timing Variations	0.027+0.023 −0.02	0.139±0.006	—	9.341	—	—	2014	
Kepler-339b	Transit	—	0.127±0.059	—	4.977656 ±0.000019	0.055	—	2014	
Kepler-339c	Transit	—	0.103±0.046	—	6.988055 ±0.000053	0.069	—	2014	
Kepler-339d	Transit	—	0.104±0.047	—	10.558345 ±0.000081	0.091	—	2014	
Kepler-340b	Transit	—	0.226±0.054	—	14.844387 ±0.000473	0.134	—	2014	
Kepler-340c	Transit	—	0.301±0.069	—	22.824669 ±0.000481	0.178	—	2014	
Kepler-341b	Transit	—	0.105±0.055	—	5.195528 ±0.000053	0.06	—	2014	
Kepler-341c	Transit	—	0.152±0.077	—	8.01041 ±0.000049	0.08	—	2014	
Kepler-341d	Transit	—	0.165±0.084	—	27.666313 ±0.000297	0.182	—	2014	
Kepler-341e	Transit	—	0.178±0.092	—	42.473269 ±0.000633	0.242	—	2016	
Kepler-342b	Transit	—	0.201±0.036	—	15.170318 ±0.000059	0.128	—	2014	
Kepler-342c	Transit	—	0.175±0.031	—	26.234138 ±0.000163	0.185	—	2014	
Kepler-342d	Transit	—	0.222±0.043	—	39.459357 ±0.000375	0.242	—	2014	
Kepler-342e	Transit	—	0.079+0.007 −0.005	—	1.64422461 ±0.00000621	—	—	2014	
Kepler-343b	Transit	—	0.215±0.045	—	8.96855 ±0.000058	0.088	—	2014	
Kepler-343c	Transit	—	0.18±0.034	—	23.22182 ±0.000234	0.167	—	2014	
Kepler-344b	Transit	—	0.233±0.109	—	21.963945 ±0.000108	0.153	—	2014	
Kepler-344c	Transit	—	0.263±0.123	—	125.596809 ±0.001728	0.488	—	2014	
Kepler-345b	Transit	—	0.066±0.005	—	7.415563 ±0.000054	0.066	—	2014	
Kepler-345c	Transit	—	0.107±0.006	—	9.387427 ±0.000028	0.077	—	2014	
Kepler-346b	Transit	—	0.237±0.111	—	6.511127 ±0.000017	0.071	—	2014	
Kepler-346c	Transit	—	0.274±0.13	—	23.851549 ±0.000098	0.168	—	2014	
Kepler-347b	Transit	—	0.176±0.084	—	12.79836 ±0.000106	0.11	—	2014	
Kepler-347c	Transit	—	0.156±0.075	—	27.320871 ±0.000457	0.183	—	2014	
Kepler-348b	Transit	—	0.136±0.026	—	7.05677 ±0.000031	0.076	—	2014	
Kepler-348c	Transit	—	0.119±0.022	—	17.265427 ±0.000179	0.138	—	2013	
Kepler-349b	Transit	—	0.17±0.064	—	5.929778 ±0.00002	0.065	—	2013	
Kepler-349c	Transit	—	0.175±0.066	—	12.247629 ±0.000063	0.105	—	2014	
Kepler-350b	Transit	—	0.165±0.034	—	11.189562 ±0.000119	0.104	—	2014	
Kepler-350c	Transit	0.019±0.01	0.277+0.127 −0.054	—	17.849	—	—	2016	
Kepler-350d	Transit	0.047+0.017 −0.015	0.25+0.114 −0.048	—	26.136	—	—	2014	
Kepler-351b	Transit	—	0.273±0.138	—	37.054919 ±0.000484	0.214	—	2014	
Kepler-351c	Transit	—	0.285±0.138	—	57.24809 ±0.000599	0.287	—	2014	
Kepler-351d	Transit	—	0.243+0.017 −0.027	—	142.544247 ±0.002303	—	—	2014	
Kepler-352b	Transit	—	0.077±0.007	—	10.05537 ±0.000194	0.085	—	2014	
Kepler-352c	Transit	—	0.111±0.009	—	16.332995 ±0.000272	0.118	—	2014	
Kepler-353b	Transit	—	0.079±0.005	—	5.795278 ±0.000055	0.051	—	2014	
Kepler-353c	Transit	—	0.123±0.006	—	8.410894 ±0.000039	0.065	—	2014	
Kepler-354b	Transit	—	0.164±0.052	—	5.47666 ±0.000024	0.054	—	2014	
Kepler-354c	Transit	—	0.117±0.037	—	16.934402 ±0.000228	0.115	—	2014	
Kepler-354d	Transit	—	0.111±0.036	—	24.209842 ±0.000403	0.146	—	2014	
Kepler-355b	Transit	—	0.13±0.059	—	11.03189 ±0.000338	0.102	—	2014	
Kepler-355c	Transit	—	0.242±0.109	—	25.762294 ±0.000267	0.179	—	2014	
Kepler-356b	Transit	—	0.14±0.026	—	4.612696 ±0.000021	0.057	—	2014	
Kepler-356c	Transit	—	0.161±0.029	—	13.121632 ±0.000088	0.115	—	2014	
Kepler-357b	Transit	—	0.164±0.096	—	6.475434 ±0.000034	0.063	—	2014	
Kepler-357c	Transit	—	0.238±0.14	—	16.85837 ±0.000081	0.12	—	2014	
Kepler-357d	Transit	—	0.306±0.182	—	49.499875 ±0.00046	0.246	—	2014	
Kepler-358b	Transit	—	0.243±0.121	—	34.060467 ±0.000194	0.21	—	2014	
Kepler-358c	Transit	—	0.254±0.128	—	83.488369 ±0.00083	0.381	—	2014	
Kepler-359b	Transit	—	0.315±0.146	—	25.563222 ±0.000202	0.178	—	2014	
Kepler-359c	Transit	—	0.384±0.178	—	57.68802 ±0.000545	0.307	—	2014	
Kepler-359d	Transit	—	0.358±0.17	—	77.095691 ±0.001453	0.372	—	2014	
Kepler-360b	Transit	—	0.147±0.07	—	3.289672 ±0.000012	0.044	—	2014	
Kepler-360c	Transit	—	0.187±0.089	—	7.186434 ±0.000029	0.075	—	2014	
Kepler-361b	Transit	—	0.129±0.025	—	8.486616 ±0.000084	0.086	—	2014	
Kepler-361c	Transit	—	0.225±0.043	—	55.188023 ±0.000655	0.3	—	2014	
Kepler-362b	Transit	—	0.079±0.034	—	10.327186 ±0.000101	0.087	—	2014	
Kepler-362c	Transit	—	0.129±0.054	—	37.866281 ±0.000298	0.207	—	2014	
Kepler-363b	Transit	—	0.103±0.017	—	3.614568 ±0.000053	0.048	—	2014	
Kepler-363c	Transit	—	0.151±0.024	—	7.542427 ±0.000058	0.079	—	2014	
Kepler-363d	Transit	—	0.183±0.036	—	11.932125 ±0.000093	0.107	—	2014	
Kepler-364b	Transit	—	0.138±0.033	—	25.745718 ±0.000548	0.178	—	2014	
Kepler-364c	Transit	—	0.192±0.037	—	59.980627 ±0.000879	0.312	—	2014	
Kepler-365b	Transit	—	0.182±0.087	—	10.664903 ±0.000069	0.098	—	2014	
Kepler-365c	Transit	—	0.146±0.069	—	17.784129 ±0.000215	0.137	—	2014	
Kepler-366b	Transit	—	0.13±0.059	—	3.281959 ±0.000022	0.045	—	2014	
Kepler-366c	Transit	—	0.16±0.072	—	12.51616 ±0.000095	0.11	—	2014	
Kepler-367b	Transit	—	0.116±0.014	—	37.815724 ±0.000279	0.201	—	2014	
Kepler-367c	Transit	—	0.107±0.014	—	53.578637 ±0.000382	0.253	—	2014	
Kepler-368b	Transit	—	0.291±0.081	—	26.84768 ±0.000326	0.186	—	2014	
Kepler-368c	Transit	—	0.346±0.096	—	72.379334 ±0.00137	0.36	—	2014	
Kepler-369b	Transit	—	0.101±0.005	—	2.732756 ±0.000009	0.03	—	2014	
Kepler-369c	Transit	—	0.126±0.005	—	14.871572 ±0.000083	0.094	—	2014	
Kepler-370b	Transit	—	0.142±0.07	—	4.57953 ±0.000041	0.054	—	2014	
Kepler-370c	Transit	—	0.17±0.079	—	19.02293 ±0.000177	0.14	—	2014	
Kepler-371b	Transit	—	0.169±0.046	—	34.763278 ±0.000351	0.2	—	2014	
Kepler-371c	Transit	—	0.159±0.04	—	67.968015 ±0.00107	0.313	—	2014	
Kepler-372b	Transit	—	0.121±0.053	—	6.849692 ±0.000134	0.075	—	2014	
Kepler-372c	Transit	—	0.186±0.08	—	20.053763 ±0.00019	0.154	—	2014	
Kepler-372d	Transit	—	0.151±0.065	—	30.092568 ±0.00068	0.201	—	2014	
Kepler-373b	Transit	—	0.121±0.06	—	5.535309 ±0.000029	0.06	—	2014	
Kepler-373c	Transit	—	0.111±0.055	—	16.725948 ±0.000227	0.126	—	2014	
Kepler-374b	Transit	—	0.092±0.048	—	1.897806 ±0.000011	0.029	—	2014	
Kepler-374c	Transit	—	0.098±0.051	—	3.282807 ±0.00002	0.042	—	2014	
Kepler-374d	Transit	—	0.117±0.062	—	5.028219 ±0.00004	0.056	—	2014	
Kepler-375b	Transit	—	0.129±0.045	—	12.125934 ±0.000204	0.101	—	2014	
Kepler-375c	Transit	—	0.236±0.086	—	19.986326 ±0.000184	0.141	—	2014	
Kepler-376b	Transit	—	0.095±0.02	—	4.920199 ±0.000073	0.057	—	2014	
Kepler-376c	Transit	—	0.16±0.032	—	14.172327 ±0.000108	0.115	—	2014	
Kepler-377b	Transit	—	0.124±0.024	—	12.509529 ±0.000257	0.109	—	2014	
Kepler-377c	Transit	—	0.184±0.035	—	27.014976 ±0.000347	0.182	—	2014	
Kepler-378b	Transit	—	0.067±0.013	—	16.092361 ±0.000073	0.112	—	2014	
Kepler-378c	Transit	—	0.062±0.004	—	28.906009 ±0.000216	0.166	—	2014	
Kepler-379b	Transit	—	0.148±0.028	—	20.09838 ±0.00018	0.152	—	2014	
Kepler-379c	Transit	—	0.204±0.038	—	62.784697 ±0.000661	0.326	—	2014	
Kepler-380b	Transit	—	0.106±0.021	—	3.930821 ±0.000038	0.05	—	2014	
Kepler-380c	Transit	—	0.113±0.025	—	7.630004 ±0.000073	0.078	—	2014	
Kepler-381b	Transit	—	0.088±0.02	—	5.629021 ±0.000028	0.066	—	2014	
Kepler-381c	Transit	—	0.1±0.022	—	13.391635 ±0.000129	0.117	—	2014	
Kepler-382b	Transit	—	0.118±0.056	—	5.262155 ±0.000047	0.055	—	2014	
Kepler-382c	Transit	—	0.142±0.069	—	12.162701 ±0.000109	0.097	—	2014	
Kepler-383b	Transit	—	0.118±0.046	—	12.904532 ±0.000121	0.095	—	2014	
Kepler-383c	Transit	—	0.111±0.044	—	31.200751 ±0.000354	0.172	—	2014	
Kepler-384b	Transit	—	0.1±0.029	—	22.597053 ±0.000243	0.148	—	2014	
Kepler-384c	Transit	—	0.101±0.029	—	45.348269 ±0.000779	0.236	—	2014	
Kepler-385b	Transit	—	0.244±0.123	—	10.043686 ±0.000128	0.097	—	2014	
Kepler-385c	Transit	—	0.271±0.139	—	15.163161 ±0.000269	0.127	—	2014	
Kepler-386b	Transit	—	0.124±0.073	—	12.31043 ±0.000218	0.096	—	2014	
Kepler-386c	Transit	—	0.141±0.079	—	25.193458 ±0.000342	0.155	—	2014	
Kepler-387b	Transit	—	0.092±0.021	—	6.791636 ±0.000094	0.068	—	2014	
Kepler-387c	Transit	—	0.079±0.02	—	11.837549 ±0.000329	0.098	—	2014	
Kepler-388b	Transit	—	0.072±0.009	—	3.173315 ±0.000018	0.036	—	2014	
Kepler-388c	Transit	—	0.077±0.01	—	13.297004 ±0.000185	0.093	—	2014	
Kepler-389b	Transit	—	0.135±0.069	—	3.244107 ±0.00003	0.041	—	2014	
Kepler-389c	Transit	—	0.13±0.067	—	14.51143 ±0.000305	0.11	—	2014	
Kepler-390b	Transit	—	0.073±0.006	—	6.738088 ±0.000067	0.065	—	2014	
Kepler-390c	Transit	—	0.07±0.007	—	13.060022 ±0.000257	0.101	—	2014	
Kepler-391b	Transit	—	0.285±0.07	—	7.416755 ±0.000129	0.082	—	2014	
Kepler-391c	Transit	—	0.316±0.077	—	20.485435 ±0.000393	0.161	—	2014	
Kepler-392b	Transit	—	0.089±0.019	—	5.341853 ±0.000055	0.059	—	2014	
Kepler-392c	Transit	—	0.098±0.021	—	10.423118 ±0.000087	0.093	—	2014	
Kepler-393b	Transit	—	0.115±0.022	—	9.182417 ±0.000096	0.091	—	2014	
Kepler-393c	Transit	—	0.119±0.028	—	14.613612 ±0.000231	0.124	—	2014	
Kepler-394b	Transit	—	0.143±0.073	—	8.005013 ±0.00009	0.083	—	2013	
Kepler-394c	Transit	—	0.148±0.077	—	12.130686 ±0.00018	0.11	—	2013	
Kepler-395b	Transit	—	0.092±0.007	—	7.054346 ±0.00007	0.061	—	2014	
Kepler-395c	Transit	—	0.118±0.008	—	34.989262 ±0.000543	0.177	—	2014	
Kepler-396b	Transit	0.238+0.037 −0.018	0.312+0.114 −0.058	—	42.994	—	—	2014	
Kepler-396c	Transit	0.056+0.009 −0.004	0.473+0.174 −0.088	—	88.505	—	—	2014	
Kepler-397b	Transit	—	0.219±1.902	—	22.250949 ±0.000186	0.144	—	2016	
Kepler-397c	Transit	—	0.551±0.05	—	135.498527 ±0.000668	0.48	—	2014	
Kepler-398b	Transit	—	0.083±0.009	—	4.081423 ±0.000011	0.044	—	2014	
Kepler-398c	Transit	—	0.09±0.01	—	11.419412 ±0.000047	0.087	—	2014	
Kepler-398d	Transit	—	0.079+0.003 −0.004	—	6.83437001 ±0.00001518	—	—	2014	
Kepler-399b	Transit	—	0.086±0.045	—	14.425281 ±0.000144	0.103	—	2014	
Kepler-399c	Transit	—	0.128±0.069	—	26.67569 ±0.000171	0.155	—	2014	
Kepler-399d	Transit	—	0.169±0.09	—	58.034616 ±0.000363	0.261	—	2014	
Kepler-400b	Transit	—	0.147±0.027	—	9.024389 ±0.000034	0.087	—	2016	
Kepler-400c	Transit	—	0.133±0.025	—	17.340824 ±0.0001	0.134	—	2014	
Kepler-401b	Transit	—	0.153±0.036	—	14.383035 ±0.000211	0.122	—	2014	
Kepler-401c	Transit	—	0.192±0.036	—	47.318218 ±0.000695	0.269	—	2014	
Kepler-401d	Transit	—	0.203+0.036 −0.023	—	184.256405 ±0.00317	—	—	2014	
Kepler-402b	Transit	—	0.109±0.021	—	4.028751 ±0.000019	0.051	—	2014	
Kepler-402c	Transit	—	0.139±0.031	—	6.124821 ±0.000026	0.068	—	2014	
Kepler-402d	Transit	—	0.123±0.024	—	8.921099 ±0.000056	0.087	—	2016	
Kepler-402e	Transit	—	0.13±0.026	—	11.242861 ±0.000059	0.102	—	2014	
Kepler-403b	Transit	—	0.112±0.02	—	7.031462 ±0.000051	0.076	—	2014	
Kepler-403c	Transit	—	0.156±0.029	—	54.280749 ±0.000562	0.297	—	2014	
Kepler-403d	Transit	—	0.127+0.027 −0.017	—	13.61159129 ±0.00008288	—	—	2014	
Kepler-404b	Transit	—	0.113±0.049	—	11.829851 ±0.000209	0.102	—	2014	
Kepler-404c	Transit	—	0.153±0.076	—	14.751166 ±0.000261	0.118	—	2014	
Kepler-405b	Transit	—	0.186±0.088	—	10.613839 ±0.000111	0.095	—	2014	
Kepler-405c	Transit	—	0.416±2.378	—	29.726682 ±0.011477	0.188	—	2014	
Kepler-406b	Transit	0.02±0.004	0.128±0.003	11.82±2.7	2.42629	—	—	2014	
Kepler-406c	Transit	0.009±0.006	0.076±0.003	24.39±16.13	4.62332	—	—	2014	
Kepler-407b	Transit	—	0.095±0.002	—	0.66931	—	—	2013	
Kepler-407c	Radial Velocity	12.6±6.3	—	—	3000 ±500	—	—	2013	
Kepler-408b	Transit	—	0.073±0.003	—	2.46502	—	—	2016	
Kepler-409b	Transit	—	0.106±0.003	—	68.9584	—	—	2014	
Kepler-410Ab	Transit	—	0.253±0.005	—	17.833648 ±0.000054	0.1226±0.0047	0.17+0.1 −0.05	2014	
Kepler-411b	Transit	—	0.168±0.018	—	3.00516 ±0.00001	0.038±0.001	0+0.35 −0	2014	
Kepler-411c	Transit	—	0.292+0.011 −0.006	—	7.83442788 ±0.00000298	—	—	2014	
Kepler-412b	Transit	0.941+0.125 −0.019	1.341+0.044 −0.046	0.52+0.13 −0.04	1.7208604 ±0.0000003	0.02897+0.00093 −0.00092	—	2014	
Kepler-413b	Transit	0.211+0.069 −0.066	0.388±0.009	3.2±1	66.262 ±0.024	0.3553+0.002 −0.0018	0.1181+0.0018 −0.0017	2014	
Kepler-414b	Transit Timing Variations	0.011+0.011 −0.009	0.153+0.028 −0.012	—	4.7	—	—	2014	
Kepler-414c	Transit Timing Variations	0.094+0.039 −0.033	0.269+0.048 −0.022	—	7.171	—	—	2014	
Kepler-415b	Transit Timing Variations	0.377+0.321 −0.275	0.108+0.012 −0.009	—	4.176	—	—	2014	
Kepler-415c	Transit Timing Variations	—	—	—	8.708	—	—	2014	
Kepler-416b	Transit Timing Variations	0.183+0.168 −0.124	0.221+0.088 −0.029	—	6.319	—	—	2014	
Kepler-416c	Transit Timing Variations	—	—	—	12.209	—	—	2014	
Kepler-417b	Transit Timing Variations	0.035+0.029 −0.025	0.206+0.077 −0.015	—	12.331	—	—	2014	
Kepler-417c	Transit Timing Variations	—	—	—	15.943	—	—	2014	
Kepler-418b	Transit	1.1	1.2±0.16	—	86.67856 ±0.00007	—	0.2±0.11	2014	
Kepler-419b	Transit	2.5±0.3	0.96±0.12	—	69.7546 ±0.0007	0.37+0.007 −0.006	0.833±0.013	2014	
Kepler-419c	Transit Timing Variations	7.3±0.4	—	—	675.47 ±0.11	1.68±0.03	0.184±0.002	2014	
Kepler-421b	Transit	—	0.371+0.017 −0.014	—	704.1984 ±0.0016	1.219±0.089	0.041+0.095 −0.034	2014	
Kepler-422b	Transit	0.43±0.13	1.15±0.11	0.38±0.11	7.8914483 ±0.0000005	0.082+0.011 −0.01	—	2014	
Kepler-423b	Transit	0.595±0.081	1.192±0.052	0.459±0.083	2.6843285 ±0.00000007	0.03585+0.00052 −0.00114	0.019+0.028 −0.014	2014	
Kepler-424b	Transit	1.03±0.13	0.89+0.08 −0.06	1.94±0.25	3.3118644 ±0.00000039	0.044+0.005 −0.004	—	2014	
Kepler-424c	Radial Velocity	6.97±0.62	—	—	223.3 ±2.1	0.73+0.08 −0.07	—	2014	
Kepler-425b	Transit	0.25±0.08	0.978±0.022	0.27±0.07	3.79701816 ±0.00000019	0.0464±0.0008	0.33	2014	
Kepler-426b	Transit	0.34±0.08	1.09±0.03	0.26±0.06	3.21751883 ±0.00000019	0.0414±0.001	0.18	2014	
Kepler-427b	Transit	0.29±0.09	1.23±0.21	0.16±0.14	10.290994 ±0.0000011	0.091±0.01	0.57	2014	
Kepler-428b	Transit	1.27±0.19	1.08±0.03	1.02±0.15	3.52563254 ±0.00000015	0.0433±0.0009	0.22	2014	
Kepler-430b	Transit	—	0.29	—	35.968	0.2244	—	2015	
Kepler-430c	Transit	—	0.16	—	110.979	0.4757	—	2015	
Kepler-431b	Transit	—	0.068	—	6.803	0.0719	—	2015	
Kepler-431c	Transit	—	0.06	—	8.703	0.0847	—	2015	
Kepler-431d	Transit	—	0.1	—	11.922	0.1045	—	2015	
Kepler-432b	Transit	5.41+0.32 −0.18	1.145+0.036 −0.039	4.46+0.37 −0.29	52.501129 ±0.000067	0.301+0.016 −0.011	0.5134+0.0098 −0.0089	2015	
Kepler-432c	Radial Velocity	2.43+0.22 −0.24	—	—	406.2 ±3.9	—	0.498+0.029 −0.059	2015	
Kepler-433b	Transit	2.82±0.52	1.45±0.16	1.13±0.32	5.33408384 ±0.0000011	0.0679±0.0027	0.119±0.079	2015	
Kepler-434b	Transit	2.86±0.35	1.13+0.26 −0.18	2.4±1.3	12.8747099 ±0.000005	0.1143±0.003	0.131±0.072	2015	
Kepler-435b	Transit	0.84±0.15	1.99±0.18	0.131±0.037	8.6001536 ±0.0000018	0.0948±0.0018	0.114±0.077	2015	
Kepler-436b	Transit	—	0.24±0.02	—	64.00205 ±0.00072	0.339+0.134 −0.053	0.19+0.13 −0.11	2015	
Kepler-436c	Transit	—	0.208+0.017 −0.012	—	16.79713874 ±0.00008561	—	—	2016	
Kepler-437b	Transit	—	0.19±0.02	—	66.65062 ±0.00033	0.288+0.066 −0.04	0.02+0.08 −0.02	2015	
Kepler-438b	Transit	—	0.1+0.01 −0.02	—	35.23319 ±0.00025	0.166+0.051 −0.042	0.03+0.1 −0.03	2015	
Kepler-439b	Transit	—	0.2+0.01 −0.04	—	178.1396 ±0.0016	0.563+0.165 −0.08	0.03+0.08 −0.03	2015	
Kepler-440b	Transit	—	0.17±0.02	—	101.11141 ±0.00087	0.242+0.066 −0.041	0.34+0.12 −0.19	2015	
Kepler-441b	Transit	—	0.15±0.02	—	207.2482 ±0.0022	0.64+0.32 −0.13	0.1+0.11 −0.1	2015	
Kepler-442b	Transit	—	0.12+0.01 −0.02	—	112.3053 ±0.0024	0.409+0.209 −0.06	0.04+0.08 −0.04	2015	
Kepler-443b	Transit	—	0.21±0.02	—	177.6693 ±0.0031	0.495+0.186 −0.075	0.11+0.15 −0.11	2015	
Kepler-444b	Transit	—	0.036±0.001	—	3.6001053 ±0.0000083	0.04178±0.00079	0.16+0.21 −0.1	2015	
Kepler-444c	Transit	—	0.044±0.002	—	4.5458841 ±0.000007	0.04881±0.00093	0.31+0.12 −0.15	2015	
Kepler-444d	Transit	—	0.047±0.002	—	6.189392 ±0.000012	0.06±0.0011	0.18+0.16 −0.12	2015	
Kepler-444e	Transit	—	0.049+0.002 −0.001	—	7.743493 ±0.000017	0.0696±0.0013	0.1+0.2 −0.07	2015	
Kepler-444f	Transit	—	0.066±0.004	—	9.740486 ±0.000013	0.0811±0.0015	0.29+0.2 −0.19	2015	
Kepler-445b	Transit	—	0.14±0.02	—	2.984151 ±0.000011	—	0	2015	
Kepler-445c	Transit	—	0.22±0.03	—	4.871229 ±0.000011	—	0	2015	
Kepler-445d	Transit	—	0.11±0.02	—	8.15275 ±0.0004	—	0	2015	
Kepler-446b	Transit	—	0.13±0.02	—	1.565409 ±0.0000033	—	0	2015	
Kepler-446c	Transit	—	0.1±0.02	—	3.036179 ±0.0000055	—	0	2015	
Kepler-446d	Transit	—	0.12±0.02	—	5.148921 ±0.000022	—	0	2015	
Kepler-447b	Transit	1.37+0.48 −0.46	1.65+0.59 −0.56	0.4+0.94 −0.32	7.79430132 ±0.00000182	0.0769+0.0062 −0.0079	0.123+0.037 −0.036	2015	
Kepler-449b	Transit	—	0.183±0.006	—	12.58242 ±0.00027	—	0.03+0.28 −0.03	2015	
Kepler-449c	Transit	—	0.247±0.008	—	33.6727 ±0.001	—	0.05+0.24 −0.05	2015	
Kepler-450b	Transit	—	0.548±0.029	—	28.454851 ±0.000025	—	0.02+0.14 −0.02	2015	
Kepler-450c	Transit	—	0.234±0.012	—	15.413135 ±0.000085	—	0.02+0.17 −0.02	2015	
Kepler-450d	Transit	—	0.075±0.006	—	7.51464 ±0.00023	—	0.14+0.24 −0.14	2015	
Kepler-451b	Eclipse Timing	1.86±0.05	—	—	406 ±4	0.9±0.04	0.33±0.05	2015	
Kepler-451c	Timing	1.61±0.14	—	—	1460 ±90	2.1±0.2	0.29±0.07	2022	
Kepler-451d	Timing	1.76±0.18	—	—	43 ±0.1	0.2±0.03	0	2022	
Kepler-452b	Transit	—	0.145+0.021 −0.018	—	384.843 ±0.007	1.046+0.019 −0.015	—	2015	
Kepler-453b	Transit	0.00063±0.05034	0.553±0.003	—	240.503 ±0.053	0.7903±0.0028	0.0359±0.0088	2015	
Kepler-454b	Transit	0.02152±0.0044	0.211±0.012	2.76±0.73	10.57375339 ±0.00000777	0.0954±0.0012	0	2015	
Kepler-454c	Radial Velocity	4.46±0.12	—	—	523.9 ±0.7	—	0.0214±0.0077	2015	
Kepler-455b	Transit	—	0.616	—	1322.3	—	—	2015	
Kepler-456b	Transit	—	0.589	—	1320	—	—	2015	
Kepler-457b	Transit	—	0.366	—	31.8099	—	—	2015	
Kepler-457c	Transit	—	0.214	—	75.2	—	—	2015	
Kepler-458b	Transit	—	0.4	—	572.3847	1.3337	—	2015	
Kepler-459b	Transit	—	0.49	—	854.083	—	—	2015	
Kepler-460b	Transit	—	0.57	—	440.7813	1.1455	—	2015	
Kepler-461b	Transit	—	0.23+0.006 −0.005	—	8.31378306 ±0.00000766	—	—	2016	
Kepler-462b	Transit	—	0.336+0.055 −0.046	—	84.6879808 ±0.0002068	—	—	2016	
Kepler-463b	Transit	—	0.272+0.038 −0.027	—	8.98101683 ±0.00000316	—	—	2016	
Kepler-464b	Transit	—	0.294+0.014 −0.012	—	7.25696522 ±0.00000577	—	—	2016	
Kepler-465b	Transit	—	0.263+0.022 −0.014	—	9.94067247 ±0.00000655	—	—	2016	
Kepler-466b	Transit	—	0.254+0.02 −0.015	—	51.07926307 ±0.00006345	—	—	2016	
Kepler-466c	Transit	—	0.112+0.009 −0.006	—	3.70921385 ±0.00000632	—	—	2016	
Kepler-467b	Transit	—	0.201+0.027 −0.007	—	24.99324193 ±0.00006498	—	—	2016	
Kepler-468b	Transit	—	1.19+0.029 −0.026	—	38.47875707 ±0.00000485	—	—	2016	
Kepler-470b	Transit	—	1.288+0.52 −0.238	—	24.66919569 ±0.00000541	—	—	2016	
Kepler-471b	Transit	—	1.335+0.484 −0.264	—	5.01423457 ±0.00000059	—	—	2016	
Kepler-472b	Transit	—	0.287+0.012 −0.025	—	4.17625551 ±0.00000184	—	—	2016	
Kepler-473b	Transit	—	0.364+0.07 −0.06	—	14.55731705 ±0.00001399	—	—	2016	
Kepler-474b	Transit	—	0.273+0.043 −0.033	—	5.66067294 ±0.00000373	—	—	2016	
Kepler-475b	Transit	—	0.222+0.004 −0.016	—	3.10550819 ±0.00000104	—	—	2016	
Kepler-476b	Transit	—	0.275+0.045 −0.027	—	14.00640607 ±0.00001794	—	—	2016	
Kepler-477b	Transit	—	0.185+0.016 −0.011	—	11.11990653 ±0.0000116	—	—	2016	
Kepler-478b	Transit	—	0.242+0.008 −0.029	—	13.2217576 ±0.0000139	—	—	2016	
Kepler-479b	Transit	—	0.189+0.008 −0.006	—	12.49341307 ±0.0000136	—	—	2016	
Kepler-480b	Transit	—	0.248+0.026 −0.019	—	4.9195838 ±0.0000049	—	—	2016	
Kepler-481b	Transit	—	0.223+0.033 −0.026	—	10.06082567 ±0.00001522	—	—	2016	
Kepler-482b	Transit	—	0.211+0.033 −0.012	—	56.35418576 ±0.00009371	—	—	2016	
Kepler-483b	Transit	—	0.286+0.061 −0.038	—	30.229104 ±0.00007851	—	—	2016	
Kepler-484b	Transit	—	0.203+0.006 −0.004	—	10.04556931 ±0.0000072	—	—	2016	
Kepler-485b	Transit	—	1.286+0.302 −0.145	—	3.2432598 ±0.00000018	—	—	2016	
Kepler-486b	Transit	—	0.981+0.036 −0.05	—	30.36044667 ±0.00000424	—	—	2016	
Kepler-487b	Transit	—	1.019+0.062 −0.047	—	15.3587684 ±0.00000221	—	—	2016	
Kepler-487c	Transit	—	0.239+0.016 −0.044	—	38.6519976 ±0.0002517	—	—	2016	
Kepler-489b	Transit	—	0.689+0.015 −0.018	—	17.27629612 ±0.00000245	—	—	2016	
Kepler-490b	Transit	—	1.039+0.294 −0.123	—	3.26869515 ±0.00000023	—	—	2016	
Kepler-491b	Transit	—	0.796+0.071 −0.045	—	4.22538451 ±0.00000027	—	—	2016	
Kepler-492b	Transit	—	0.856+0.107 −0.054	—	11.72012266 ±0.00000153	—	—	2016	
Kepler-493b	Transit	—	1.35+0.446 −0.227	—	3.00387658 ±0.00000099	—	—	2016	
Kepler-494b	Transit	—	0.637+0.118 −0.089	—	8.02511821 ±0.00000227	—	—	2016	
Kepler-495b	Transit	—	0.467+0.037 −0.03	—	3.41303622 ±0.0000006	—	—	2016	
Kepler-496b	Transit	—	0.207+0.017 −0.012	—	8.30864937 ±0.0000109	—	—	2016	
Kepler-497b	Transit	—	0.539+0.141 −0.059	—	3.57320367 ±0.00000091	—	—	2016	
Kepler-498b	Transit	—	0.27+0.045 −0.03	—	9.61375356 ±0.00001173	—	—	2016	
Kepler-499b	Transit	—	0.194+0.022 −0.014	—	5.63252845 ±0.00000575	—	—	2016	
Kepler-500b	Transit	—	0.23+0.022 −0.015	—	8.5083244 ±0.00000911	—	—	2016	
Planet	Discovery method	Mass (M_{J})	Radius (R_{J})	Density (g/cm^{3})	Orbital period (days)	Semimajor axis (AU)	Orbital eccentricity	Year of confirmation	Ref.

back to top
