= Kepler-15 =

Star in the constellation Cygnus

Observation data Epoch J2000 Equinox ICRS
- Constellation: Cygnus
- Right ascension: 19^{h} 44^{m} 48.1365^{s}
- Declination: +49° 08′ 24.298″
- Apparent magnitude (V): 13.8

Characteristics
- Evolutionary stage: subgiant
- Spectral type: G8IV-V

Astrometry
| Proper motion (μ) | RA: −2.755(15) mas/yr Dec.: −12.129(17) mas/yr |
| Parallax (π) | 1.3181±0.0139 mas |
| Distance | 2,470 ± 30 ly (759 ± 8 pc) |

Details
| Mass | 1.018 ^{+0.052}_{−0.044} M_{☉} |
| Radius | 0.992 ^{+0.070}_{−0.058} R_{☉} |
| Luminosity | 0.82 L_{☉} |
| Surface gravity (log g) | 4.32±0.1 cgs |
| Temperature | 5,679±50 K |
| Metallicity | 0.36±0.07 |
| Rotational velocity (v sin i) | 2.0 km/s |
| Age | 3.7 Gyr |

Other designations
- KOI-128, KIC 11359879, 2MASS J19444814+4908244, Gaia DR2 2134850847813263360

Database references
| SIMBAD | data |
| KIC | data |

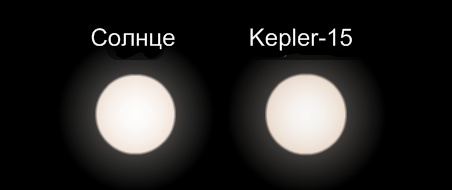
Comparative sizes of Sun and Kepler-15

Kepler-15 (also known as KOI-128 or KIC 11359879 is a G-type subgiant with a mass of 1.018 solar masses and a radius of 1.253 solar radius.

== Planetary system ==
Kepler-15 is orbited by one known planet named Kepler-15b, a hot jupiter enriched in heavy elements. It was discovered by the transit method in 2011.

The Kepler-15 planetary system
| Companion (in order from star) | Mass | Semimajor axis (AU) | Orbital period (days) | Eccentricity | Inclination (°) | Radius |
|---|---|---|---|---|---|---|
| b | 0.66±0.09 M_{J} | 0.05714±0.00093 | 4.942782±1.3e-06 | — | 87.44±1.5 | 0.96±0.07 R_{J} |
