= Kepler-60d =

Exoplanet

Discovery
- Discovery date: 2012
- Detection method: Transit (Kepler Mission)

Orbital characteristics
- Orbital period (sidereal): 11.9016171 (± 0.0002) d
- Star: Kepler-60 (KOI-2086)

Physical characteristics
- Mean radius: 0.23 R_{J}
- Mass: 0.68 M_{J}

Kepler-60d is a planet discovered in 2012 that orbits the star Kepler-60. It was found by the Kepler Mission using the transit method.

Physical Characteristics:

Kepler is a confirmed exoplanet that is approximately 1.99 times the radius of Earth and has an estimated mass of 4.16 Earth masses. NASA classifies the planet as neptune like because of its size and characteristics. Kepler-60d orbits a G - type star called Kepler-60 and is one of three confirmed planets in the system.

Orbit and Planetary system:

Kepler-60d completes one orbit around its host star approximately every 11.9 Earth days. It orbits at a distance of about 0.102 astronomical units, making it much closer to its star than earth is to the Sun. The Kepler-60 contains three confirmed planets: Kepler-60b, Kepler-60c, and Kepler-60d. Their orbital periods are approximately 7.13, 8.92, and 11.9 days.

Orbital Resonance:

Kepler-60d is known for its unusual orbital relationships. The three confirmed planets have orbital periods that are close to mathematical ratios, suggesting that their gravitational interactions influence their movement around the star. Astronomers have studied the system for evidence of a three body Laplace resonance. A 2015 study found that these interactions may play an important role in the long term stability of the Kepler-60d planetary system.

Scientific Research:

Scientists have studied Kepler-60d using transit timing variations, which are small changes in the times that a planet passes in front of its host star. These changes can occur because of gravitational interactions between planets. Researchers have used this technique to estimate the masses of the planets in the Kepler-60d system and investigate the stability of their orbits. These changes system is of scientific interest because its closely spaced planets provide opportunities to study planetary dynamics and orbital resonances.

Recent Scientific Studies:

A 2023 study by Leleu and colleagues reexamined the properties of 34 planets discovered by the Kepler mission, including Kepler-60d. The researchers investigated how inaccuracies in transit timing measurements could affect estimates of planetary masses and densities. Their analysis produced an estimated mass of 4.40 Earth masses and a radius of approximately 2.51 Earth radii
