= Kepler-15b =

Exoplanet

Discovery
- Discovered by: Michael Endl et al.
- Discovery date: 13 July 2011
- Detection method: Transit method

Orbital characteristics
- Semi-major axis: 0.05714 AU (8,548,000 km)
- Orbital period (sidereal): 4.942782 d
- Inclination: 87.44
- Star: Kepler-15

Physical characteristics
- Mean radius: 0.96 R_{J}
- Mass: 0.66 M_{J}
- Mean density: 0.93 g/cm^{3} (0.034 lb/cu in)

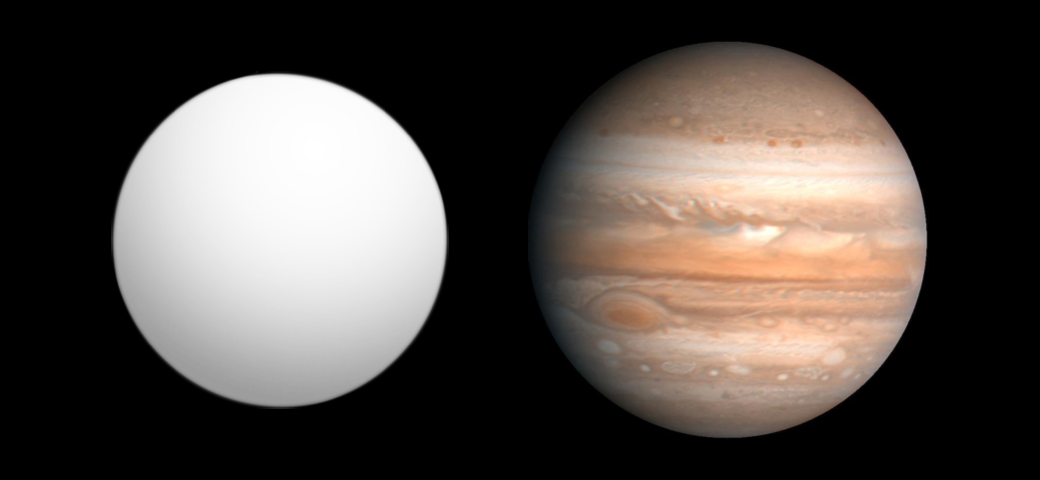
Comparison of best-fit size of the exoplanet Kepler-9 b with the Solar System planet Jupiter, as reported in the Open Exoplanet Catalogue, 2015

Kepler-15b is a planet discovered by the Kepler spacecraft. It is a hot Jupiter, with a mass of 0.66^{+0.08}_{−0.09} M_{J}, a radius 0.96^{+0.06}_{−0.07} R_{J} and a period of about 4.94 days.

== See also ==
- Kepler-15 - the host star
