= Kepler-447b =

Hot gas giant similar to Jupiter in composition

Discovery
- Discovered by: Kepler Spacecraft
- Discovery date: 2015
- Detection method: Primary Transit

Orbital characteristics
- Semi-major axis: 0.0769 - 0.0062 + 0.0079 AU
- Eccentricity: 0.12 ± 0.04
- Orbital period (sidereal): 7.79430132 ± 1.82e-06 d
- Inclination: 86.55 - 0.24 + 0.32
- Star: Kepler-447

Physical characteristics
- Mean radius: 1.65 ± 0.59 R_{J}
- Mass: 1.37 ± 0.48 M_{J}

Kepler-447b is a confirmed exoplanet. The planet's mass and radius indicate that it is a gas giant with a bulk composition similar to that of Jupiter. Unlike Jupiter, but similar to many planets detected around other stars, Kepler-447b is located very close to its star, and belongs to the class of planets known as hot Jupiters. It has an extremely grazing transit, a property that could be used to detect further properties such as perturbations of the orbit due to other nearby objects or stellar pulsations.
