= Kepler-283 c =

Exoplanet

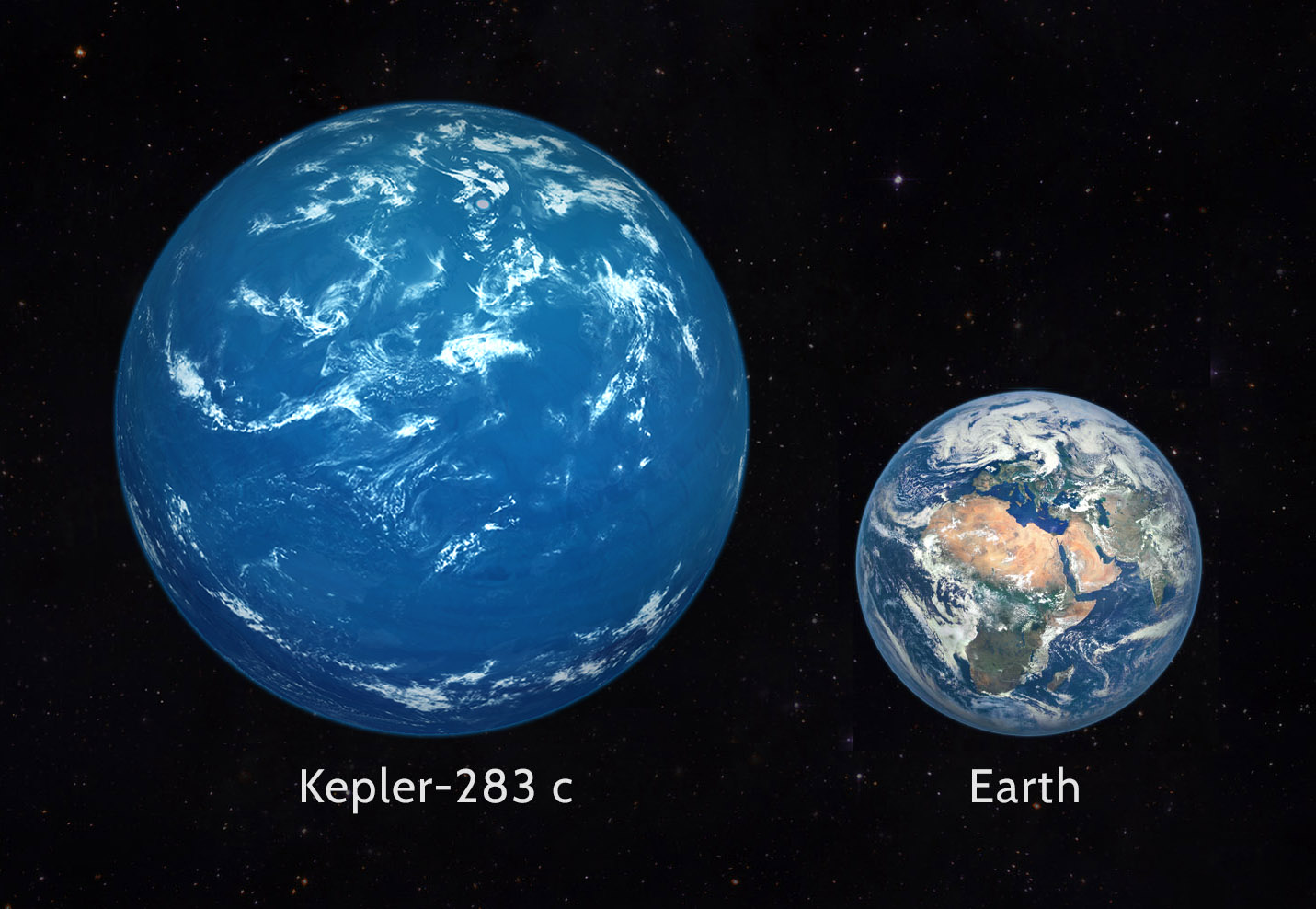
- Size comparison of the planet Kepler-283 c (artistic concept) with Earth

Discovery
- Discovery site: Kepler Space Observatory
- Discovery date: 2014
- Detection method: Transit

Orbital characteristics
- Semi-major axis: 0.336144±2.93e-06 AU
- Eccentricity: 0
- Orbital period (sidereal): 92.750106±0.001214 d
- Inclination: 88.43±0.846
- Star: Kepler-283

Physical characteristics
- Mean radius: 1.82 R_{🜨}
- Synodic rotation period: ≙9.11 hr
- Temperature: 238.5 K (−34.6 °C; −30.4 °F)

Kepler-283 c is an exoplanet orbiting the K-type star Kepler-283, discovered by the Kepler space telescope in 2014. The star is of spectral type K7V, located about 1,596 light years from Earth in the constellation of Cygnus.

The planet orbits its star every 93 days, in the circumstellar habitable zone at a distance of around 0.336 AU. Its orbit is circular with an eccentricity of 0. Kepler-283 c has a surface equilibrium temperature of 238.5 K (−34.6 °C; −30.4 °F). Its radius is 1.82 R_{🜨}.
