= Kepler-124b =

Short-orbit Earth-mass exoplanet

Discovery
- Discovery date: 20 March 2014
- Detection method: Primary Transit

Orbital characteristics
- Semi-major axis: 0.039 AU (5,800,000 km)
- Orbital period (sidereal): 3.4105 ± 0.0000 d
- Star: Kepler-124

Physical characteristics
- Mean radius: 0.729 ± 0.045 R_{🜨}

Kepler-124b is an extrasolar planet discovered in 2014. It is located 359 parsecs (1,170 light-years) from Earth, orbiting the unclassified star Kepler-124 in the constellation Draco. Within the Kepler-124 system (KOI-241) there are three known planets, Kepler-124b being both the smallest and closest to its parent star.

== Characteristics ==
Kepler-124b is located 359 parsecs (1,170 light-years) from Earth orbiting the star Kepler-124. Both Kepler-124b and its host star are smaller than our own planet and star, respectively; Kepler-124b is estimated to be 0.729±0.045 Earth radii (0.065±0.004 Jupiter radii), and its parent star Kepler-124 is estimated to be 68.7% of the mass the Sun, approximately 0.636±0.030 solar radii.

It is the smallest discovered planet in the Kepler-124 system, and has the closest orbit of the three known planets. Kepler-124b orbits 96% closer to its star than Earth (approximately 3 Earth days), which in the Kepler-124 system is inside the inner limit of the star's habitable zone.

== Discovery ==
Like many Exoplanets discovered by the Kepler telescope, Kepler-124b was found using the transit method. The transit method utilizes the high magnification and numerous instruments on the Kepler telescope to detect slight fluctuations in brightness of a star being observed. These dips can indicate the presence planet and determine certain parameters of it as well. Kepler-124b was initially only a planet candidate but was later confirmed as an exoplanet; a statistical analysis by a team at NASA Ames Research Center validated the existence of Kepler-124b with 99% assurance, along with Kepler-124c and Kepler-124d. Although scientists are very confident about some of Kepler-124b's parameters, many are still unknown.
