= Kepler-18 =

Star in the constellation Cygnus

Observation data Epoch J2000 Equinox ICRS
- Constellation: Cygnus
- Right ascension: 19^{h} 52^{m} 19.0688^{s}
- Declination: +44° 44′ 46.808″
- Apparent magnitude (V): 14.0

Characteristics
- Evolutionary stage: main sequence
- Spectral type: G7

Astrometry
Radial velocity (R_{v})	−18.40±0.02 km/s
Proper motion (μ)	RA: −1.436(14) mas/yr Dec.: −20.341(14) mas/yr
Parallax (π)	2.2804±0.0168 mas
Distance	1,430 ± 10 ly (439 ± 3 pc)

Details
Mass	0.972 ± 0.042 M_{☉}
Radius	1.108 ± 0.051 R_{☉}
Luminosity	0.93 L_{☉}
Surface gravity (log g)	4.32 ± 0.12 cgs
Temperature	5,383 ± 44 K
Metallicity [Fe/H]	0.19 ± 0.06 dex
Rotational velocity (v sin i)	<4 km/s
Age	10.0 ± 2.3 Gyr

Other designations
- KOI-137, KIC 8644288, 2MASS J19521906+4444467, Gaia DR2 2079295583282164992

Database references
SIMBAD	data
Exoplanet Archive	data

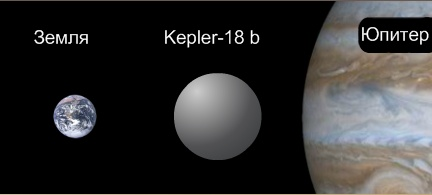
Comparative sizes of Earth, Kepler-18 b and Jupiter

Kepler-18 is a star with a system of three exoplanets, positioned in the northern Constellation of Cygnus. It has an apparent visual magnitude of 14.0, requiring a telescope to view. Based on parallax measurements, it is located at a distance of approximately 1,430 light-years (440 pc). It is drifting closer with a line of sight velocity component of −18.4 km/s.

This is an older star with an estimated age of around ten billion years. It has similar properties to the Sun with almost the same mass and a 10% larger radius. The star is radiating 93% of the Sun's luminosity from its photosphere at an effective temperature of 5,383 K.

== Planetary system ==
The star is orbited by 3 confirmed transiting planets, announced in 2011. In 2021, it was found the orbital plane of Kepler-18d is slowly changing, likely under the gravitational influence of the additional giant planet.

The Kepler-18 planetary system
Companion (in order from star)	Mass	Semimajor axis (AU)	Orbital period (days)	Eccentricity	Inclination (°)	Radius
b	6.9 ± 3.4 M_{🜨}	0.0447 ± 0.0006	3.504725 ± 0.000028	—	84.92 ± 0.26	2.00 ± 0.10 R_{🜨}
c	17.3 ± 1.9 M_{🜨}	0.0752 ± 0.0011	7.6415716	—	87.68 ± 0.22	5.49 ± 0.26 R_{🜨}
d	16.4 ± 1.4 M_{🜨}	0.1172 ± 0.0017	14.858941	—	88.07 ± 0.1	6.98 ± 0.33 R_{🜨}
