= Kepler-390c =

Terrestrial exoplanet

Kepler-390 c
Discovery
- Discovery date: 2014

Orbital characteristics
- Semi-major axis: 1.01 AU
- Mean orbit radius: 0.79 x Earth
- Eccentricity: 0.0
- Orbital period (sidereal): 13.1 days

Physical characteristics
- Mass: 0.418 M_{🜨}

Kepler-390 c is a terrestrial exoplanet that orbits a K-type star Kepler-390. Its mass is 0.418 Earths, it takes 13.1 days to complete one orbit of its star, and is 0.101 AU from its star. Its discovery was announced in 2014.

The exoplanet was discovered through transit method, where a planet crosses (transits) in front of its parent star's disk.
