= Kepler-59b =

Super-Earth orbiting Kepler-59

Discovery
- Discovered by: Jason H. Steffen et al.
- Discovery date: 16 August 2012
- Detection method: Transit method

Orbital characteristics
- Orbital period (sidereal): 11.8681707 ± 0.00036 d
- Star: Kepler-59

Physical characteristics
- Mean radius: 1.1 R_{🜨}
- Mass: <1.37 M_{🜨}

Kepler-59b is an exoplanet orbiting the star Kepler-59, located in the constellation Lyra. It was discovered by the Kepler telescope in August 2012. It completes an orbit around its parent star once every 11.9 days. It has a radius that is 1.1 times that of the Earth.
