= Kepler-298d =

Exoplanet in the habitable zone

Discovery
- Discovered by: Jason F. Rowe et al.
- Discovery site: Kepler
- Discovery date: February 26, 2014
- Detection method: Transit method

Orbital characteristics
- Orbital period (sidereal): 77.473633 d
- Time of periastron: JD 2454985.64156
- Star: Kepler-298

Physical characteristics
- Mean radius: 2.50 ± 0.20 R_{🜨}

Kepler-298d is an exoplanet orbiting within the habitable zone of the orange dwarf star Kepler-298, located 1545 light years (473.69 parsecs) away from Earth. It was discovered in 2014 via the transit method. The planet was originally considered to be potentially habitable, but further research places its atmosphere at +2.11 on the HZA scale, meaning it may be an ocean planet with a thick gas atmosphere like a gas dwarf.

== See also ==
- List of potentially habitable exoplanets
