= List of exoplanets discovered in 2014 =

This is a List of exoplanets discovered in 2014.

For exoplanets detected only by radial velocity, the mass value is actually a lower limit. (See Minimum mass for more information)

Name	Mass (M_{J})	Radius (R_{J})	Period (days)	Semi-major axis (AU)	Temp. (K)	Discovery method	Distance (ly)	Host star mass (M_{☉})	Host star temp. (K)	Remarks
BD-11 4672 b	0.53		1667	2.28		radial vel.	89	0.57	4475	
Beta Cancri b	7.8		605.2	1.7		radial vel.	290.4	1.7	4092.1	
Beta Ursae Minoris b	6.1		522.3	1.4		radial vel.	126.5	1.4	4126	
COROT-22b	0.038	0.435	9.75598	0.092	885	transit	1930	1.1	5939	
COROT-24b	0.018	0.33	5.1134	0.056	1070	transit	2000	0.91	4950	
COROT-24c	0.088	0.44	11.759	0.098	850	transit	2000	0.91	4950	
COROT-27b	10.39	1.007	3.57532	0.0476	1500	transit	3400±200	1.05	5900	Planet lost
Gliese 15 Ab	0.017		11.4433	0.0717		radial vel.	11.6	0.38	3567	
Gliese 27.1 b	0.0409		15.819	0.101		radial vel.	77.05	0.53	3542	Alternately known as Gliese 9018, not related to Gliese 27.
Gliese 180 b	0.0261		17.380	0.103		radial vel.	38.95	0.43	3371	
Gliese 433 c	0.14		4900^{+1800}_{−1000}	4.7^{+1.2}_{−0.8}		radial vel.	29.57	0.48	3472	
Gliese 422 b	0.0311		26.161	0.119		radial vel.	41.32	0.35	3323	
Gliese 687 b	0.058		38.14	0.16353		radial vel.	14.8	0.41	3413	
Gliese 3293 b	0.07406		30.5987	0.14339		radial vel.	51.4	0.42	3466	
Gliese 3293 c	0.06636		122.6196	0.36175		radial vel.	51.4	0.42	3466	
Gliese 3341 b	0.0208		14.207	0.089		radial vel.	77.1	0.47	3526	
GU Piscium b	11.3	1.265		2000		imaging	160	0.33	3250±32	
HAT-P-49b	1.73	1.413	2.691548	0.0438	2131	transit	1050	1.54	6820	
HAT-P-54b	0.76	0.944	3.799847	0.04117		transit	443	0.65	4390	Disputed in 2016, reconfirmed in 2021.
HATS-4b	1.323	1.02	2.516729	0.0362	1315	transit	1400	1	5403	
HATS-5b	0.237	0.912	4.763387	0.0542	1025	transit	840	0.94	5304	
HATS-6b	0.319	0.998	3.3252725	0.03623		transit	484	0.57	3724	
HD 564 b	0.33		492.3	1.2		radial vel.	175	0.96	5902	
HD 4203 c	2.17		6700	6.95		radial vel.	253.8	1.13	5702	
HD 5319 c	1.15		886	2.071		radial vel.	370	1.51	4958	
HD 10442 b	2.1		1043	2.335		radial vel.	443±4	1.56	5034	
HD 11506 c	0.408±0.057		223.41±0.32	0.774±0.038		radial vel.	167.4±0.4	1.12±0.02	5833±28	
HD 14067 b	7.8		1455	3.4		radial vel.	533	2.4	4815	
HD 30669 b	0.47		1684	2.69		radial vel.	186	0.92	5400	
HD 75784 b	1.15		341.7	1.073		radial vel.	224	1.41	4917	
HD 100546 b		3.4		53		imaging	320	2.4	10500	
HD 103720 b	0.62		4.5557	0.0498		radial vel.	136	0.79	5017	
HD 108341 b	3.5		1129	2		radial vel.	161	0.84	5122	
HD 114613 b	0.48		3827	5.16		radial vel.	66.8	1.36	5729	
HD 141399 b	0.451		94.44	0.415		radial vel.	118	1.07	5600	
HD 141399 c	1.33		201.99	0.689		radial vel.	118	1.07	5600	
HD 141399 d	1.18		1069.8	2.09		radial vel.	118	1.07	5600	
HD 141399 e	0.66		5000	5		radial vel.	118	1.07	5600	
HD 154857 c	2.58		3452	5.36		radial vel.	223.5	1.72	5605	
HIP 67851 b	1.38		88.9	0.46		radial vel.	208.3±0.6	1.63	4890	
HIP 67851 c	4.34±0.59		1741±39	3.09±0.18		radial vel.	208.3±0.6	1.63	4890	
HIP 97233 b	20		1058.8	2.55		radial vel.	347	1.93	5020	
HIP 105854 b	8.2		184.2	0.81		radial vel.	276	2.1	4780	
HIP 116454 b	0.037	0.226	9.1205	0.0906		radial vel.	180	0.78	5089	
Kapteyn b	0.015		48.616^{+0.036}_{−0.032}	0.168		radial vel.	12.8	0.28	3550	Existence of planet been disputed.
Kapteyn c	0.022		121.54	0.311		radial vel.	12.8	0.28	3550	Existence of planet been disputed.
Kepler-23d		0.196	15.274299	0.124		transit	2600	1.11	5828	
Kepler-24d		0.149	4.244384	0.051		transit	3900	1.03	5897	
Kepler-24e		0.248	18.998355	0.138		transit	3900	1.03	5897	
Kepler-25d	0.283		123			radial vel.	798±4	1.19	6270	
Kepler-26d		0.095	3.543919	0.039		transit	1104±10	0.54	3914	
Kepler-26e		0.215	46.827915	0.22		transit	1104±10	0.54	3914	
Kepler-31d	6.8	0.348	87.6451	0.4		transit	6800	1.21	6340	
Kepler-37e			51.196			timing	220	0.8	5417	
Kepler-48d	0.025	0.182	42.8961			transit	1009±5	0.88	5194	
Kepler-48e	2.067		982			radial vel.	1009±5	0.88	5194	
Kepler-49d		0.143	2.576549	0.031		transit	1024±8	0.55	4252	
Kepler-49e		0.139	18.596108	0.116		transit	1024±8	0.55	4252	
Kepler-51d	0.024	0.865	130.194	0.509		transit	2610±50	1.04	6018	
Kepler-52d		0.174	36.445171	0.182		transit	1058±7	0.54	4263	
Kepler-53d		0.189	9.751962	0.091		transit	4600±200	0.98	5858	
Kepler-54d		0.136	20.995694	0.126		transit	893±9	0.51	4252	
Kepler-55d		0.142	2.211099	0.029		transit	1920±30	0.62	4503	
Kepler-55e		0.138	4.617534	0.048		transit	1920±30	0.62	4503	
Kepler-55f		0.142	10.198545	0.081		transit	1920±30	0.62	4503	
Kepler-58d		0.262	40.101371	0.236		transit	3250±80	0.95	6099	
Kepler-79d	0.019	0.639	52.0902	0.287	553	transit	3230±60	1.17	6174	
Kepler-79e	0.013	0.311	81.0659	0.386	477	transit	3230±60	1.17	6174	
Kepler-80d	0.02124	0.136	3.07222	0.0372		transit	1160	0.73	4540	
Kepler-80e	0.01299	0.143	4.64489	0.0491		transit	1160	0.73	4540	
Kepler-81d		0.108	20.837846	0.128		transit	1147±10	0.64	4500	
Kepler-82d		0.158	2.382961	0.034		transit	3030±80	0.85	5428	
Kepler-82e		0.22	5.902206	0.063		transit	3030±80	0.85	5428	
Kepler-83d		0.173	5.169796	0.051		transit	1320±17	0.66	4648	
Kepler-84d		0.123	4.224537	0.052		transit	4700±500	1	6031	
Kepler-84e		0.232	27.434389	0.181		transit	4700±500	1	6031	
Kepler-84f		0.196	44.552169	0.25		transit	4700±500	1	6031	
Kepler-85d		0.107	17.91323	0.13		transit	2550±50	0.92	5436	
Kepler-85e		0.113	25.216751	0.163		transit	2550±50	0.92	5436	
Kepler-93b	0.01265	0.132	4.72673978	0.053	1037	transit	313.7±0.7	0.91	5669	
Kepler-93c	3		1460			radial vel.	313.7±0.7	0.91	5669	
Kepler-94b	0.034	0.313	2.50806			transit	629±2	0.81	4781	
Kepler-94c	9.836		820.3			radial vel.	629±2	0.81	4781	
Kepler-95b	0.041	0.305	11.5231			transit	1472±18	1.08	5699	
Kepler-96b	0.027	0.238	16.2385			transit	402.2±1.3	1	5690	
Kepler-97b	0.011	0.132	2.58664			transit	1322±11	0.94	5779	
Kepler-97c	1.08		789			radial vel.	1322±11	0.94	5779	
Kepler-98b	0.011	0.178	1.54168			transit	1154±9	0.99	5539	
Kepler-99b	0.019	0.132	4.60358			transit	683±3	0.79	4782	
Kepler-100b	0.023	0.118	6.88705			transit	1002±5	1.08	5825	
Kepler-100c		0.196	12.8159			transit	1002±5	1.08	5825	
Kepler-100d		0.144	35.3331			transit	1002±5	1.08	5825	
Kepler-101b	0.16	0.51	3.4876812	0.0474		transit	3110±50	1.17	5667	
Kepler-101c	0.01	0.112	6.02976	0.0684		transit	3110±50	1.17	5667	
Kepler-102b		0.042	5.28696		792	transit	352.7±0.7	0.81	4909	
Kepler-102c		0.052	7.07142		718	transit	352.7±0.7	0.81	4909	
Kepler-102d	0.012	0.105	10.3117			transit	352.7±0.7	0.81	4909	
Kepler-102f		0.079	27.4536		457	transit	352.7±0.7	0.81	4909	
Kepler-103b	0.031	0.301	15.9654			transit	1637±19	1.09	5845	
Kepler-103c	0.114	0.459	179.612			transit	1637±19	1.09	5845	
Kepler-104b		0.277	11.427548	0.094		transit	1322±14	0.81	5711	
Kepler-104c		0.279	23.668205	0.153		transit	1322±14	0.81	5711	
Kepler-104d		0.319	51.755394	0.257		transit	1322±14	0.81	5711	
Kepler-105c	0.01447	0.117	7.1262			transit	1517±18	0.96	5827	
Kepler-106b		0.073	6.16486			transit	1470±20	1	5858	
Kepler-106c	0.033	0.223	13.5708			transit	1470±20	1	5858	
Kepler-106d		0.085	23.9802			transit	1470±20	1	5858	
Kepler-106e	0.035	0.228	43.8445			transit	1470±20	1	5858	
Kepler-107b		0.139	3.179997	0.044		transit	1741±18		5851	
Kepler-107c		0.161	4.901425	0.059		transit	1741±18		5851	
Kepler-107d		0.095	7.958203	0.082		transit	1741±18		5851	
Kepler-107e		0.308	14.749049	0.123		transit	1741±18		5851	
Kepler-108b		0.772	49.183921	0.292		transit	4200±500	0.87	5854	
Kepler-108c		0.73	190.323494	0.721		transit	4200±500	0.87	5854	
Kepler-109b		0.211	6.48163			transit	1570±17	1.04	5952	
Kepler-109c		0.225	21.2227			transit	1570±17	1.04	5952	
Kepler-110b		0.163	12.691112	0.107		transit	1950±30		5960	
Kepler-110c		0.197	31.719775	0.198		transit	1950±30		5960	
Kepler-111b		0.141	3.341815	0.046		transit	2190±20		5952	
Kepler-111c		0.651	224.784608	0.761		transit	2190±20		5952	
Kepler-112b		0.211	8.408878	0.076		transit	1698±14		5544	
Kepler-112c		0.214	28.574263	0.172		transit	1698±14		5544	
Kepler-113b	0.037	0.162	4.754			transit	862±3	0.75	4725	
Kepler-113c		0.194	8.92507			transit	862±3	0.75	4725	
Kepler-114b		0.112	5.188549	0.053	722	transit	852±4	0.56	4605	
Kepler-115b		0.097	2.403679	0.036		transit	2070±20	1	5979	
Kepler-115c		0.232	8.990889	0.087		transit	2070±20	1	5979	
Kepler-116b		0.305	5.968734	0.069		transit	3200±50	1.16	6142	
Kepler-116c		0.205	13.07163	0.116		transit	3200±50	1.16	6142	
Kepler-117b	0.094	0.719	18.7959228	0.1445		transit	4700	1.13	6150	
Kepler-117c	1.84	1.101	50.790391	0.2804		transit	4700	1.13	6150	
Kepler-118b		0.175	7.518496	0.073		transit	1900±20	0.86	5274	
Kepler-118c		0.685	20.17202	0.141		transit	1900±20	0.86	5274	
Kepler-119b		0.321	2.422082	0.035		transit	2340±40		5595	
Kepler-119c		0.082	4.125103	0.049		transit	2340±40		5595	
Kepler-120b		0.192	6.312501	0.055		transit	1281±10		4096	
Kepler-120c		0.136	12.794585	0.088		transit	1281±10		4096	
Kepler-121b		0.209	3.177422	0.039		transit	1690±20		5311	
Kepler-121c		0.203	41.008011	0.216		transit	1690±20		5311	
Kepler-122b		0.209	5.766193	0.064		transit	3450±70	0.99	6050	
Kepler-122c		0.524	12.465988	0.108		transit	3450±70	0.99	6050	
Kepler-122d		0.196	21.587475	0.155		transit	3450±70	0.99	6050	
Kepler-122e		0.232	37.993273	0.227		transit	3450±70	0.99	6050	
Kepler-122f	0.113	0.156	56.268			timing	3450±70	0.99	6050	?
Kepler-123b		0.262	17.232366	0.135		transit	3430±80	1.03	6089	
Kepler-123c		0.132	26.695074	0.181		transit	3430±80	1.03	6089	
Kepler-124b		0.065	3.410493	0.039		transit	1386±10		4984	
Kepler-124c		0.156	13.821375	0.1		transit	1386±10		4984	
Kepler-124d		0.099	30.950851	0.17		transit	1386±10		4984	
Kepler-125b		0.211	4.164389	0.041		transit	601±3	0.55	3810	
Kepler-125c		0.066	5.774464	0.051		transit	601±3	0.55	3810	
Kepler-126b		0.136	10.495711	0.099		transit	779±5		6239	
Kepler-126c		0.141	21.869741	0.162		transit	779±5		6239	
Kepler-126d		0.223	100.283134	0.448		transit	779±5		6239	
Kepler-127b		0.125	14.435889	0.125		transit	1162±8		6106	
Kepler-127c		0.237	29.393195	0.2		transit	1162±8		6106	
Kepler-127d		0.236	48.630408	0.28		transit	1162±8		6106	
Kepler-129b		0.211	15.79186	0.131		transit	1349±14	1.18	5770	
Kepler-129c		0.227	82.20017	0.393		transit	1349±14	1.18	5770	
Kepler-130c		0.259	27.50868	0.178		transit	1042±7	1	5884	
Kepler-130d		0.146	87.517905	0.377		transit	1042±7	1	5884	
Kepler-131b	0.051	0.215	16.092			transit	750±4	1.02	5685	
Kepler-131c	0.026	0.075	25.5169			transit	750±4	1.02	5685	
Kepler-132b		0.108	6.178196	0.067		transit	900±70		6003	
Kepler-132c		0.114	6.414914	0.068		transit	900±70		6003	
Kepler-132d		0.138	18.010199	0.136		transit	900±70		6003	
Kepler-133b		0.157	8.129976	0.083		transit	2170±60		5736	
Kepler-133c		0.253	31.517586	0.204		transit	2170±60		5736	
Kepler-134b		0.178	5.317429	0.06		transit	1102±7		5983	
Kepler-134c		0.112	10.105785	0.092		transit	1102±7		5983	
Kepler-135b		0.161	6.00253	0.067		transit	2060±40		6090	
Kepler-135c		0.103	11.448708	0.103		transit	2060±40		6090	
Kepler-136b		0.183	11.5789	0.106		transit	1389±14	1.2	6165	
Kepler-136c		0.178	16.399235	0.133		transit	1389±14	1.2	6165	
Kepler-137b		0.131	8.436387	0.077		transit	996±6		5187	
Kepler-137c		0.168	18.735753	0.13		transit	996±6		5187	
Kepler-138b	0.00021	0.047	10.3126			transit	218.5±0.3	0.52	3841	
Kepler-138c	0.0062	0.107	13.7813			transit	218.5±0.3	0.52	3841	
Kepler-138d	0.00201	0.108	23.0881		431	transit	218.5±0.3	0.52	3841	
Kepler-139b		0.262	15.771044	0.127		transit	1289±13	1.08	5594	
Kepler-139c		0.302	157.072878	0.586		transit	1289±13	1.08	5594	
Kepler-140b		0.144	3.25427	0.045		transit	1940±20		6077	
Kepler-140c		0.161	91.353282	0.414		transit	1940±20		6077	
Kepler-141b		0.062	3.107675	0.039		transit	990±4	1	4910	
Kepler-141c		0.126	7.010606	0.067		transit	990±4	1	4910	?
Kepler-142b		0.178	2.024152	0.032		transit	1818±13	0.99	5790	
Kepler-142c		0.255	4.761702	0.057		transit	1818±13	0.99	5790	
Kepler-142d		0.193	41.809118	0.242		transit	1818±13	0.99	5790	
Kepler-143b		0.215	16.007583	0.127		transit	2700±40		5848	
Kepler-143c		0.301	27.082511	0.181		transit	2700±40		5848	
Kepler-144b		0.119	5.885273	0.066		transit	1269±10	1.03	6075	
Kepler-144c		0.12	10.104665	0.094		transit	1269±10	1.03	6075	
Kepler-146b		0.331	31.158799	0.2		transit	2390±30		5948	
Kepler-146c		0.279	76.732171	0.364		transit	2390±30		5948	
Kepler-147b		0.136	12.610584	0.113		transit	3500±90	1.01	6012	
Kepler-147c		0.217	33.416423	0.216		transit	3500±90	1.01	6012	
Kepler-148b		0.161	1.729366	0.028		transit	2640±50		5272	
Kepler-148c		0.321	4.180043	0.05		transit	2640±50		5272	
Kepler-149b		0.376	29.198943	0.184		transit	1893±19		5381	
Kepler-149c		0.144	55.328328	0.281		transit	1893±19		5381	
Kepler-149d		0.353	160.018032	0.571		transit	1893±19		5381	
Kepler-150b		0.112	3.428054	0.044		transit	2980±60		5560	
Kepler-150c		0.329	7.381998	0.073		transit	2980±60		5560	
Kepler-150d		0.249	12.56093	0.104		transit	2980±60		5560	
Kepler-150e		0.278	30.826557	0.189		transit	2980±60		5560	
Kepler-151b		0.273	15.228958	0.116		transit	2160±30	0.83	5460	
Kepler-151c		0.186	24.674612	0.16		transit	2160±30	0.83	5460	
Kepler-152b		0.249	18.207973	0.124		transit	1457±10		5088	
Kepler-152c		0.213	88.255055	0.356		transit	1457±10		5088	
Kepler-153b		0.261	18.870227	0.129		transit	1518±11		5404	
Kepler-153c		0.226	46.90232	0.237		transit	1518±11		5404	
Kepler-154b		0.202	33.040532	0.198		transit	3070±60	0.89	5690	
Kepler-154c		0.263	62.303276	0.303		transit	3070±60	0.89	5690	
Kepler-155b		0.186	5.931194	0.056		transit	965±7	0.58	4508	
Kepler-155c		0.2	52.661793	0.242		transit	965±7	0.58	4508	
Kepler-156b		0.205	4.973456	0.054		transit	1465±11		5094	
Kepler-156c		0.227	15.906801	0.117		transit	1465±11		5094	
Kepler-157b		0.118	1.732342	0.028		transit	2580±40		5774	
Kepler-157c		0.2	13.5405	0.11		transit	2580±40		5774	
Kepler-158b		0.189	16.709184	0.111		transit	1037±6		4623	
Kepler-158c		0.17	28.551383	0.158		transit	1037±6		4623	
Kepler-159b		0.212	10.139623	0.082		transit	1232±10		4625	
Kepler-159c		0.304	43.595792	0.218		transit	1232±10		4625	
Kepler-160b		0.137	4.309427	0.05		transit	3140±60	0.88	5471^{+115}_{−37}	
Kepler-160c		0.322	13.699087	0.109		transit	3140±60	0.88	5471^{+115}_{−37}	
Kepler-161b		0.189	4.921355	0.054		transit	1435±10	0.77	5078	
Kepler-161c		0.183	7.06424	0.068		transit	1435±10	0.77	5078	
Kepler-162b		0.112	6.919798	0.069		transit	2860±50		5816	
Kepler-162c		0.27	19.446355	0.137		transit	2860±50		5816	
Kepler-163b		0.094	7.810937	0.078		transit	2300±40	0.96	5776	
Kepler-163c		0.202	21.347262	0.152		transit	2300±40	0.96	5776	
Kepler-164b		0.126	5.03503	0.058		transit	2980±50	1.11	5888	
Kepler-164c		0.244	10.945723	0.097		transit	2980±50	1.11	5888	
Kepler-164d		0.219	28.986769	0.187		transit	2980±50	1.11	5888	
Kepler-165b		0.207	8.180848	0.072		transit	1860±20		5211	
Kepler-165c		0.199	15.31299	0.11		transit	1860±20		5211	
Kepler-166b		0.203	7.650254	0.072		transit	2000±20		5413	
Kepler-166c		0.212	34.260281	0.195		transit	2000±20		5413	
Kepler-167b		0.144	4.3931632	0.0483		transit	1100	0.77	4890	
Kepler-167c		0.138	7.406114	0.0684		transit	1100	0.77	4890	
Kepler-168b		0.13	4.425391	0.056		transit	4550±160		6282	
Kepler-168c		0.24	13.193242	0.116		transit	4550±160		6282	
Kepler-169b		0.101	3.250619	0.04		transit	1341±9	0.86	4997	
Kepler-169c		0.108	6.195469	0.062		transit	1341±9	0.86	4997	
Kepler-169d		0.112	8.348125	0.075		transit	1341±9	0.86	4997	
Kepler-169e		0.196	13.767102	0.105		transit	1341±9	0.86	4997	
Kepler-169f		0.23	87.090195	0.359		transit	1341±9	0.86	4997	
Kepler-170b		0.285	7.930592	0.08		transit	2460±40		5679	
Kepler-170c		0.255	16.665863	0.131		transit	2460±40		5679	
Kepler-171b		0.209	4.166972	0.05		transit	2890±60		5642	
Kepler-171c		0.228	11.463462	0.098		transit	2890±60		5642	
Kepler-171d		0.169	39.595519	0.223		transit	2890±60		5642	
Kepler-172b		0.21	2.940309	0.04		transit	2770±60	0.86	5526	
Kepler-172c		0.255	6.388996	0.068		transit	2770±60	0.86	5526	
Kepler-172d		0.201	14.627119	0.118		transit	2770±60	0.86	5526	
Kepler-172e		0.246	35.118736	0.211		transit	2770±60	0.86	5526	
Kepler-173b		0.115	4.263742	0.048		transit	2780±50	0.78	6031	
Kepler-173c		0.217	8.005777	0.074		transit	2780±50	0.78	6031	
Kepler-174b		0.175	13.98179	0.1		transit	1268±8		4880	
Kepler-174c		0.133	44.000529	0.214		transit	1268±8		4880	
Kepler-174d		0.195	247.35373	0.677		transit	1268±8		4880	
Kepler-175b		0.228	11.903515	0.105		transit	4450±150	1.04	6064	
Kepler-175c		0.277	34.035257	0.213		transit	4450±150	1.04	6064	
Kepler-176b		0.128	5.433074	0.058		transit	1750±20		5232	
Kepler-176c		0.232	12.759712	0.102		transit	1750±20		5232	
Kepler-176d		0.224	25.751974	0.163		transit	1750±20		5232	
Kepler-178b		0.259	9.576694	0.085		transit	2380±30		5676	
Kepler-178c		0.257	20.552802	0.142		transit	2380±30		5676	
Kepler-178d		0.352	96.678988	0.397		transit	2380±30		5676	
Kepler-179b		0.146	2.735926	0.036		transit	2010±20		5302	
Kepler-179c		0.178	6.40013	0.064		transit	2010±20		5302	
Kepler-180b		0.134	13.817124	0.109		transit	2320±30	0.84	5731	
Kepler-180c		0.269	41.885775	0.229		transit	2320±30	0.84	5731	
Kepler-181b		0.113	3.137873	0.04		transit	2020±30		5333	
Kepler-181c		0.178	4.302149	0.049		transit	2020±30		5333	
Kepler-182b		0.23	9.825792	0.096		transit	5290±180	1.14	6250	
Kepler-182c		0.306	20.684342	0.157		transit	5290±180	1.14	6250	
Kepler-183b		0.184	5.687945	0.064		transit	3530±100		5888	
Kepler-183c		0.203	11.637071	0.103		transit	3530±100		5888	
Kepler-184b		0.211	10.687576	0.092		transit	2030±20		5788	
Kepler-184c		0.176	20.303005	0.141		transit	2030±20		5788	
Kepler-184d		0.222	29.022358	0.179		transit	2030±20		5788	
Kepler-185b		0.104	1.6329	0.026		transit	1542±15	0.79	5208	
Kepler-185c		0.18	20.729042	0.139		transit	1542±15	0.79	5208	
Kepler-186b		0.095	3.8867907	0.0343		transit	560	0.54	3755	
Kepler-186c		0.112	7.267302	0.0451		transit	560	0.54	3755	
Kepler-186d		0.125	13.342996	0.0781		transit	560	0.54	3755	
Kepler-186e		0.113	22.407704	0.11		transit	560	0.54	3755	
Kepler-186f		0.104	129.9441	0.432		transit	560	0.54	3755	? Potentially habitable exoplanet
Kepler-187b		0.126	4.938864	0.059		transit	3850±110	0.85	6105	
Kepler-187c		0.238	10.640263	0.099		transit	3850±110	0.85	6105	
Kepler-188b		0.15	2.061897	0.032		transit	3250±80		6021	
Kepler-188c		0.285	5.996553	0.066		transit	3250±80		6021	
Kepler-189b		0.108	10.399931	0.088		transit	1960±20	0.79	5235	
Kepler-189c		0.212	20.134866	0.137		transit	1960±20	0.79	5235	
Kepler-190b		0.139	2.019999	0.03		transit	1431±9	0.84	5106	
Kepler-190c		0.13	3.763024	0.045		transit	1431±9	0.84	5106	
Kepler-191b		0.12	9.939632	0.087		transit	1970±30	0.85	5282	
Kepler-191c		0.166	17.738506	0.128		transit	1970±30	0.85	5282	
Kepler-192b		0.244	9.926746	0.09		transit	2170±20		5479	
Kepler-192c		0.249	21.2234	0.15		transit	2170±20		5479	
Kepler-193b		0.213	11.38848	0.106		transit	3390±80		6335	
Kepler-193c		0.245	50.697494	0.286		transit	3390±80		6335	
Kepler-194b		0.135	2.092281	0.032		transit	3700±100		6089	
Kepler-194c		0.231	17.308032	0.131		transit	3700±100		6089	
Kepler-194d		0.214	52.814973	0.275		transit	3700±100		6089	
Kepler-195b		0.181	8.307872	0.077		transit	2170±30		5329	
Kepler-195c		0.138	34.096863	0.197		transit	2170±30		5329	
Kepler-196b		0.17	20.739886	0.138		transit	1491±10		5128	
Kepler-196c		0.2	47.427737	0.24		transit	1491±10		5128	
Kepler-197b		0.091	5.599308	0.06		transit	1088±7		6004	
Kepler-197c		0.11	10.349695	0.09		transit	1088±7		6004	
Kepler-197d		0.109	15.677563	0.119		transit	1088±7		6004	
Kepler-197e		0.081	25.209715	0.164		transit	1088±7		6004	
Kepler-198b		0.252	17.790037	0.131		transit	1638±14	0.93	5574	
Kepler-198c		0.22	49.567416	0.259		transit	1638±14	0.93	5574	
Kepler-199b		0.277	23.637604	0.158		transit	1725±14		5644	
Kepler-199c		0.29	67.093408	0.316		transit	1725±14		5644	
Kepler-200b		0.19	8.594805	0.08		transit	2210±20		5678	
Kepler-200c		0.142	10.222157	0.09		transit	2210±20		5678	
Kepler-201b		0.219	25.672083	0.175		transit	2240±30	1.17	6065	
Kepler-201c		0.254	151.884058	0.573		transit	2240±30	1.17	6065	
Kepler-202b		0.145	4.069427	0.045		transit	937±3		4668	
Kepler-202c		0.165	16.282493	0.113		transit	937±3		4668	
Kepler-203b		0.229	3.162697	0.043		transit	2340±30	0.98	5821	
Kepler-203c		0.22	5.370647	0.061		transit	2340±30	0.98	5821	
Kepler-203d		0.128	11.32972	0.1		transit	2340±30	0.98	5821	
Kepler-204b		0.226	14.400974	0.117		transit	2280±20	0.96	5812	
Kepler-204c		0.16	25.660593	0.173		transit	2280±20	0.96	5812	
Kepler-205b		0.135	2.75564	0.032		transit	523.4±1.1		4321	
Kepler-205c		0.146	20.306546	0.122		transit	523.4±1.1		4321	
Kepler-206b		0.107	7.781987	0.078		transit	1972±16	0.94	5764	
Kepler-206c		0.158	13.137471	0.111		transit	1972±16	0.94	5764	
Kepler-206d		0.106	23.44281	0.163		transit	1972±16	0.94	5764	
Kepler-207b		0.14	1.611865	0.029		transit	2920±30		5920	
Kepler-207c		0.134	3.071571	0.044		transit	2920±30		5920	
Kepler-207d		0.295	5.868075	0.068		transit	2920±30		5920	
Kepler-208b		0.145	4.22864	0.054		transit	2580±20	1.03	6092	
Kepler-208c		0.124	7.466623	0.079		transit	2580±20	1.03	6092	
Kepler-208d		0.107	11.131786	0.103		transit	2580±20	1.03	6092	
Kepler-208e		0.132	16.259458	0.132		transit	2580±20	1.03	6092	
Kepler-209b		0.202	16.087845	0.122		transit	1913±18		5513	
Kepler-209c		0.277	41.749882	0.231		transit	1913±18		5513	
Kepler-210b		0.262	2.453234	0.032		transit	764±2		4559	
Kepler-210c		0.323	7.972513	0.07		transit	764±2		4559	
Kepler-211b		0.112	4.138575	0.048		transit	1018±5	0.97	5123	
Kepler-211c		0.115	6.04045	0.062		transit	1018±5	0.97	5123	
Kepler-212b		0.097	16.257582	0.133		transit	2280±20	1.16	5852	
Kepler-212c		0.244	31.805174	0.207		transit	2280±20	1.16	5852	
Kepler-213b		0.145	2.46236	0.036		transit	2100±20	0.94	5696	
Kepler-213c		0.209	4.822962	0.057		transit	2100±20	0.94	5696	
Kepler-214b		0.233	15.660544	0.13		transit	4080±70		6169	
Kepler-214c		0.19	28.7798	0.194		transit	4080±70		6169	
Kepler-215b		0.145	9.360672	0.084		transit	1607±12	0.77	5739	
Kepler-215c		0.158	14.667108	0.113		transit	1607±12	0.77	5739	
Kepler-215d		0.213	30.864423	0.185		transit	1607±12	0.77	5739	
Kepler-215e		0.156	68.16101	0.314		transit	1607±12	0.77	5739	
Kepler-216b		0.21	7.693641	0.079		transit	4000±70		6091	
Kepler-216c		0.271	17.406669	0.136		transit	4000±70		6091	
Kepler-217b		0.199	5.374943	0.065		transit	3720±50		6171	
Kepler-217c		0.165	8.586004	0.089		transit	3720±50		6171	
Kepler-218b		0.132	3.619337	0.046		transit	2180±20		5502	
Kepler-218c		0.28	44.699576	0.248		transit	2180±20		5502	
Kepler-219b		0.263	4.585512	0.057		transit	2620±30		5786	
Kepler-219c		0.319	22.714613	0.165		transit	2620±30		5786	
Kepler-219d		0.251	47.903645	0.272		transit	2620±30		5786	
Kepler-220b		0.072	4.159807	0.046		transit	560±2		4632	
Kepler-220c		0.14	9.034199	0.076		transit	560±2		4632	
Kepler-220d		0.087	28.122397	0.163		transit	560±2		4632	
Kepler-220e		0.119	45.902733	0.226		transit	560±2		4632	
Kepler-221b		0.153	2.795906	0.037		transit	1270±9	0.72	5243	
Kepler-221c		0.261	5.690586	0.059		transit	1270±9	0.72	5243	
Kepler-221d		0.244	10.04156	0.087		transit	1270±9	0.72	5243	
Kepler-221e		0.235	18.369917	0.13		transit	1270±9	0.72	5243	
Kepler-222b		0.282	3.936981	0.048		transit	2520±40		5433	
Kepler-222c		0.414	10.08881	0.091		transit	2520±40		5433	
Kepler-222d		0.329	28.081912	0.18		transit	2520±40		5433	
Kepler-223b	0.02328	0.267	7.38449			transit	6400±400	1.12		
Kepler-223c	0.01605	0.307	9.84564			transit	6400±400	1.12		
Kepler-223d	0.02517	0.467	14.78869			transit	6400±400	1.12		
Kepler-223e	0.0151	0.41	19.72567			transit	6400±400	1.12		
Kepler-224b		0.124	3.132924	0.038		transit	2600±60	0.74	5018	
Kepler-224c		0.278	5.925003	0.058		transit	2600±60	0.74	5018	
Kepler-224d		0.205	11.349393	0.089		transit	2600±60	0.74	5018	
Kepler-224e		0.176	18.643577	0.124		transit	2600±60	0.74	5018	
Kepler-225b		0.107	6.738975	0.056		transit	1850±40		3682	
Kepler-225c		0.164	18.794234	0.111		transit	1850±40		3682	
Kepler-226b		0.138	3.940997	0.047		transit	3280±80	0.86	5571	
Kepler-226c		0.203	5.349555	0.058		transit	3280±80	0.86	5571	
Kepler-226d		0.109	8.109044	0.076		transit	3280±80	0.86	5571	
Kepler-227b		0.277	9.488015	0.09		transit	3640±100		5854	
Kepler-227c		0.271	54.418694	0.29		transit	3640±100		5854	
Kepler-228b		0.136	2.566546	0.038		transit	5600±300		6043	
Kepler-228c		0.241	4.134444	0.052		transit	5600±300		6043	
Kepler-228d		0.36	11.094286	0.101		transit	5600±300		6043	
Kepler-229b		0.196	6.252972	0.062		transit	2750±70		5120	
Kepler-229c		0.439	16.068638	0.117		transit	2750±70		5120	
Kepler-229d		0.343	41.194912	0.22		transit	2750±70		5120	
Kepler-230b		0.38	32.625555	0.191		transit	2460±40		5588	
Kepler-230c		0.182	91.773242	0.38		transit	2460±40		5588	
Kepler-231b		0.154	10.065275	0.074		transit	988±9	0.58	3767	
Kepler-231c		0.172	19.271566	0.114		transit	988±9	0.58	3767	
Kepler-232b		0.275	4.431222	0.054		transit	4570±160		5847	
Kepler-232c		0.342	11.379349	0.101		transit	4570±160		5847	
Kepler-233b		0.217	8.472382	0.077		transit	2860±60		5360	
Kepler-233c		0.242	60.418955	0.287		transit	2860±60		5360	
Kepler-234b		0.33	2.711506	0.04		transit	5900±300		6224	
Kepler-234c		0.313	7.21205	0.077		transit	5900±300		6224	
Kepler-235b		0.199	3.340222	0.037		transit	1410±20	0.59	4255	
Kepler-235c		0.114	7.824904	0.065		transit	1410±20	0.59	4255	
Kepler-235d		0.183	20.060548	0.122		transit	1410±20	0.59	4255	
Kepler-235e		0.198	46.183669	0.213		transit	1410±20	0.59	4255	
Kepler-236b		0.14	8.295611	0.065		transit	949±7	0.56	3750	
Kepler-236c		0.178	23.968127	0.132		transit	949±7	0.56	3750	
Kepler-237b		0.126	4.715106	0.05		transit	2180±30	0.7	4861	
Kepler-237c		0.186	8.103636	0.071		transit	2180±30	0.7	4861	
Kepler-238b		0.154	2.090876	0.034		transit	6200±300	1.06	5751	
Kepler-238c		0.213	6.155557	0.069		transit	6200±300	1.06	5751	
Kepler-238d		0.274	13.233549	0.115		transit	6200±300	1.06	5751	
Kepler-239b		0.208	11.763051	0.095		transit	2150±40	0.74	4914	
Kepler-239c		0.224	56.228098	0.268		transit	2150±40	0.74	4914	
Kepler-240b		0.122	4.144495	0.048		transit	2480±60		4985	
Kepler-240c		0.196	7.953528	0.074		transit	2480±60		4985	
Kepler-241b		0.208	12.718092	0.094		transit	1980±130		4699	
Kepler-241c		0.229	36.065978	0.189		transit	1980±130		4699	
Kepler-242b		0.233	8.20395	0.075		transit	1990±30		5020	
Kepler-242c		0.178	14.496481	0.109		transit	1990±30		5020	
Kepler-243b		0.219	5.715442	0.062		transit	2300±30	0.89	5228	
Kepler-243c		0.178	20.026218	0.142		transit	2300±30	0.89	5228	
Kepler-244b		0.246	4.311792	0.05		transit	3480±120		5554	
Kepler-244c		0.183	9.767292	0.087		transit	3480±120		5554	
Kepler-244d		0.206	20.050401	0.14		transit	3480±120		5554	
Kepler-245b		0.229	7.49019	0.071		transit	2870±80	0.8	5100	
Kepler-245c		0.194	17.460812	0.124		transit	2870±80	0.8	5100	
Kepler-245d		0.27	36.277108	0.202		transit	2870±80	0.8	5100	
Kepler-246b		0.209	4.60182	0.052		transit	2070±20	0.86	5206	
Kepler-246c		0.134	11.187161	0.095		transit	2070±20	0.86	5206	
Kepler-247b		0.146	3.33616	0.042		transit	2200±40		5100	
Kepler-247c		0.365	9.439452	0.084		transit	2200±40		5100	
Kepler-247d		0.352	20.477912	0.14		transit	2200±40		5100	
Kepler-248b		0.269	6.308205	0.066		transit	2460±40		5190	
Kepler-248c		0.363	16.239494	0.123		transit	2460±40		5190	
Kepler-249b		0.097	3.306539	0.035		transit	624±3		3568	
Kepler-249c		0.135	7.113702	0.058		transit	624±3		3568	
Kepler-249d		0.14	15.368459	0.097		transit	624±3		3568	
Kepler-250b		0.101	4.148141	0.048		transit	2530±50	0.8	5160	
Kepler-250c		0.203	7.156804	0.069		transit	2530±50	0.8	5160	
Kepler-250d		0.194	17.648312	0.127		transit	2530±50	0.8	5160	
Kepler-251b		0.119	4.790936	0.053		transit	3090±90	0.91	5526	
Kepler-251c		0.247	16.514043	0.122		transit	3090±90	0.91	5526	
Kepler-251d		0.247	30.133001	0.182		transit	3090±90	0.91	5526	
Kepler-251e		0.247	99.640161	0.404		transit	3090±90	0.91	5526	
Kepler-252b		0.11	6.668391	0.058		transit	1251±11	0.52	4208	
Kepler-252c		0.192	10.848463	0.08		transit	1251±11	0.52	4208	
Kepler-253b		0.145	3.783986	0.046		transit	2800±60		5208	
Kepler-253c		0.236	10.281951	0.089		transit	2800±60		5208	
Kepler-253d		0.283	18.119869	0.13		transit	2800±60		5208	
Kepler-254b		0.345	5.826662	0.064		transit	4700±200		5957	
Kepler-254c		0.192	12.412183	0.105		transit	4700±200		5957	
Kepler-254d		0.223	18.746477	0.139		transit	4700±200		5957	
Kepler-255b		0.138	5.714606	0.063		transit	3530±100	0.97	5573	
Kepler-255c		0.267	9.946047	0.092		transit	3530±100	0.97	5573	
Kepler-256b		0.142	1.620493	0.027		transit	3440±80	1.02	5551	
Kepler-256c		0.192	3.38802	0.045		transit	3440±80	1.02	5551	
Kepler-256d		0.221	5.839172	0.064		transit	3440±80	1.02	5551	
Kepler-256e		0.21	10.681572	0.096		transit	3440±80	1.02	5551	
Kepler-257b		0.233	2.382667	0.034		transit	2600±50		5180	
Kepler-257c		0.483	6.581484	0.066		transit	2600±50		5180	
Kepler-257d		0.442	24.664551	0.16		transit	2600±50		5180	
Kepler-258b		0.362	13.19722	0.103		transit	1900±20	0.8	4942	
Kepler-258c		0.322	33.653079	0.193		transit	1900±20	0.8	4942	
Kepler-259b		0.25	8.115317	0.079		transit	3360±80		5938	
Kepler-259c		0.241	36.924931	0.217		transit	3360±80		5938	
Kepler-260b		0.179	8.187399	0.075		transit	2080±20	0.88	5250	
Kepler-260c		0.155	76.050178	0.332		transit	2080±20	0.88	5250	
Kepler-261b		0.194	10.381227	0.088		transit	1044±5	0.87	5098	
Kepler-261c		0.178	24.570858	0.156		transit	1044±5	0.87	5098	
Kepler-262b		0.121	13.060855	0.108		transit	2030±20		5841	
Kepler-262c		0.146	21.853722	0.152		transit	2030±20		5841	
Kepler-263b		0.238	16.568087	0.12		transit	2510±50		5265	
Kepler-263c		0.22	47.332773	0.242		transit	2510±50		5265	
Kepler-264b		0.297	40.806231	0.249		transit	3150±60	1.32	6158	
Kepler-264c		0.252	140.101261	0.566		transit	3150±60	1.32	6158	
Kepler-265b		0.166	6.846262	0.069		transit	4330±160	1.03	5835	
Kepler-265c		0.235	17.028937	0.127		transit	4330±160	1.03	5835	
Kepler-265d		0.222	43.130617	0.236		transit	4330±160	1.03	5835	
Kepler-265e		0.231	67.831024	0.319		transit	4330±160	1.03	5835	
Kepler-266b		0.221	6.61833	0.071		transit	4640±190	0.99	5885	
Kepler-266c		0.347	107.723601	0.457		transit	4640±190	0.99	5885	
Kepler-267b		0.177	3.353728	0.037		transit	870±8	0.56	4258	
Kepler-267c		0.19	6.87745	0.06		transit	870±8	0.56	4258	
Kepler-267d		0.203	28.464515	0.154		transit	870±8	0.56	4258	
Kepler-268b		0.227	25.934138	0.18		transit	2840±30		6081	
Kepler-268c		0.302	83.446393	0.391		transit	2840±30		6081	
Kepler-269b		0.22	5.326718	0.061		transit	7900±600	0.98	5847	
Kepler-269c		0.151	8.127899	0.081		transit	7900±600	0.98	5847	
Kepler-270b		0.179	11.476094	0.107		transit	3180±40		6067	
Kepler-270c		0.158	25.262887	0.18		transit	3180±40		6067	
Kepler-271b		0.079	5.217738	0.056		transit	1334±12		5524	
Kepler-271c		0.089	7.410935	0.071		transit	1334±12		5524	
Kepler-272b		0.128	2.971353	0.038		transit	2970±40	0.79	5297	
Kepler-272c		0.16	6.057342	0.061		transit	2970±40	0.79	5297	
Kepler-272d		0.201	10.937304	0.091		transit	2970±40	0.79	5297	
Kepler-273b		0.134	2.936532	0.037		transit	2370±30		5626	
Kepler-273c		0.177	8.014927	0.073		transit	2370±30		5626	
Kepler-274b		0.137	11.634788	0.101		transit	4510±140		6023	
Kepler-274c		0.164	33.197861	0.204		transit	4510±140		6023	
Kepler-275b		0.209	10.300682	0.098		transit	7000±500	1.24	6165	
Kepler-275c		0.302	16.088134	0.132		transit	7000±500	1.24	6165	
Kepler-275d		0.297	35.676062	0.224		transit	7000±500	1.24	6165	
Kepler-276b		0.256	14.12841	0.119		transit	3850±150	1.1	6105	
Kepler-278b		0.363	30.160546	0.207		transit	1460±20		4991	
Kepler-278c		0.32	51.078775	0.294		transit	1460±20		4991	
Kepler-280b		0.129	2.139542	0.032		transit	2600±30	0.91	5744	
Kepler-280c		0.179	4.807091	0.056		transit	2600±30	0.91	5744	
Kepler-281b		0.252	14.646008	0.117		transit	6000±300	0.98	5723	
Kepler-281c		0.474	36.337373	0.215		transit	6000±300	0.98	5723	
Kepler-282b		0.09	9.220524	0.082		transit	4530±150	0.97	5602	
Kepler-282c		0.107	13.638723	0.106		transit	4530±150	0.97	5602	
Kepler-283b		0.19	11.008151	0.082		transit	1540±20		4351	
Kepler-283c		0.162	92.743711	0.341		transit	1540±20		4351	
Kepler-284b		0.2	12.699149	0.104		transit	3460±110		5615	
Kepler-284c		0.233	37.514456	0.213		transit	3460±110		5615	
Kepler-285b		0.12	2.633867	0.036		transit	2750±50	0.85	5411	
Kepler-285c		0.1	6.186676	0.064		transit	2750±50	0.85	5411	
Kepler-286b		0.111	1.796302	0.027		transit	4100±400		5580	
Kepler-286c		0.122	3.468095	0.042		transit	4100±400		5580	
Kepler-286d		0.119	5.914323	0.061		transit	4100±400		5580	
Kepler-286e		0.158	29.221289	0.176		transit	4100±400		5580	
Kepler-287b		0.208	20.342199	0.145		transit	2790±50		5806	
Kepler-287c		0.291	44.851896	0.246		transit	2790±50		5806	
Kepler-288b		0.149	6.097326	0.065		transit	4030±110	0.89	5918	
Kepler-288c		0.254	19.305772	0.14		transit	4030±110	0.89	5918	
Kepler-288d		0.238	56.633742	0.287		transit	4030±110	0.89	5918	
Kepler-289b	0.023	0.192	34.545	0.21		transit	2340±20	1.08	5990	
Kepler-289c	0.42	1.034	125.8518	0.51		transit	2340±20	1.08	5990	
Kepler-289d	0.013	0.239	66.0634	0.33		transit	2340±20	1.08	5990	?
Kepler-290b		0.201	14.589347	0.11		transit	2310±40		5147	
Kepler-290c		0.241	36.77031	0.205		transit	2310±40		5147	
Kepler-291b		0.193	3.546511	0.047		transit	6100±400	1.03	6002	
Kepler-291c		0.168	5.700786	0.065		transit	6100±400	1.03	6002	
Kepler-292b		0.118	2.580827	0.035		transit	3540±150	0.88	5299	
Kepler-292c		0.131	3.715335	0.045		transit	3540±150	0.88	5299	
Kepler-292d		0.199	7.055679	0.068		transit	3540±150	0.88	5299	
Kepler-292e		0.238	11.97901	0.097		transit	3540±150	0.88	5299	
Kepler-292f		0.21	20.834237	0.141		transit	3540±150	0.88	5299	
Kepler-293b		0.274	19.254196	0.144		transit	3260±70	1.01	5804	
Kepler-293c		0.342	54.155743	0.286		transit	3260±70	1.01	5804	
Kepler-294b		0.158	3.701212	0.048		transit	4600±200		5913	
Kepler-294c		0.242	6.6264	0.071		transit	4600±200		5913	
Kepler-295b		0.109	12.645164	0.099		transit	5800±300		5603	
Kepler-295c		0.104	21.526258	0.142		transit	5800±300		5603	
Kepler-295d		0.121	33.884054	0.192		transit	5800±300		5603	
Kepler-296b		0.144	10.864384	0.079		transit	740	0.5	3740	
Kepler-296c		0.178	5.8416366	0.0521		transit	740	0.5	3740	
Kepler-296d		0.186	19.850291	0.118		transit	740	0.5	3740	
Kepler-296e		0.136	34.14211	0.169		transit	740	0.5	3740	
Kepler-296f		0.161	63.33627	0.255		transit	740	0.5	3740	
Kepler-297b		0.256	38.871826	0.217		transit	2300±20		5619	
Kepler-297c		0.583	74.920137	0.336		transit	2300±20		5619	
Kepler-298b		0.175	10.475464	0.08		transit	1710±20	0.65	4465	
Kepler-298c		0.172	22.92881	0.136		transit	1710±20	0.65	4465	
Kepler-298d		0.223	77.473633	0.305		transit	1710±20	0.65	4465	
Kepler-299b		0.118	2.927128	0.04		transit	3530±80	0.97	5617	
Kepler-299c		0.236	6.885875	0.07		transit	3530±80	0.97	5617	
Kepler-299d		0.166	15.054786	0.118		transit	3530±80	0.97	5617	
Kepler-299e		0.167	38.285489	0.22		transit	3530±80	0.97	5617	
Kepler-300b		0.149	10.446347	0.094		transit	3690±60	0.94	5986	
Kepler-300c		0.201	40.714955	0.232		transit	3690±60	0.94	5986	
Kepler-301b		0.12	2.508553	0.036		transit	2390±30	0.91	5815	
Kepler-301c		0.12	5.419026	0.06		transit	2390±30	0.91	5815	
Kepler-301d		0.156	13.751243	0.112		transit	2390±30	0.91	5815	
Kepler-302b		0.362	30.184104	0.193		transit	4760±190		5740	
Kepler-302c		1.111	127.282184	0.503		transit	4760±190		5740	
Kepler-303b		0.079	1.937055	0.024		transit	688±3	0.59	3944	
Kepler-303c		0.102	7.061149	0.057		transit	688±3	0.59	3944	
Kepler-304b		0.255	3.295709	0.039		transit	1435±17	0.8	4731	
Kepler-304c		0.194	5.315946	0.054		transit	1435±17	0.8	4731	
Kepler-304d		0.245	9.653471	0.08		transit	1435±17	0.8	4731	
Kepler-305d		0.242	16.738661	0.121		transit	2900±80	0.76	5100	
Kepler-306b		0.136	4.646186	0.05		transit	2580±60	0.82	4954	
Kepler-306c		0.21	7.240193	0.067		transit	2580±60	0.82	4954	
Kepler-306d		0.22	17.326644	0.12		transit	2580±60	0.82	4954	
Kepler-306e		0.203	44.840975	0.227		transit	2580±60	0.82	4954	
Kepler-308b		0.189	9.694928	0.09		transit	4500±200		5895	
Kepler-308c		0.193	15.38231	0.123		transit	4500±200		5895	
Kepler-309b		0.139	5.923653	0.059		transit	1804±19		4713	
Kepler-309c		0.224	105.356383	0.401		transit	1804±19		4713	
Kepler-310b		0.106	13.930698	0.111		transit	1990±20	0.85	5797	
Kepler-310c		0.302	56.47542	0.281		transit	1990±20	0.85	5797	
Kepler-310d		0.22	92.876125	0.392		transit	1990±20	0.85	5797	
Kepler-311b		0.152	9.176092	0.087		transit	2590±30	1.06	5905	
Kepler-311c		0.128	19.738286	0.145		transit	2590±30	1.06	5905	
Kepler-312b		0.115	1.772419	0.031		transit	2660±40	1.23	6115	
Kepler-312c		0.281	19.747412	0.153		transit	2660±40	1.23	6115	
Kepler-313b		0.226	14.970418	0.125		transit	3500±300	0.9	5727	
Kepler-313c		0.229	32.273273	0.208		transit	3500±300	0.9	5727	
Kepler-314b		0.074	2.461069	0.035		transit	883±5	1.02	5378	
Kepler-314c		0.259	5.960392	0.064		transit	883±5	1.02	5378	
Kepler-315b		0.336	96.101141	0.402		transit	3910±120	0.78	5796	
Kepler-315c		0.37	265.469335	0.791		transit	3910±120	0.78	5796	
Kepler-316b		0.095	2.240508	0.027		transit	1269±12	0.53	4204	
Kepler-316c		0.103	6.827766	0.058		transit	1269±12	0.53	4204	
Kepler-317b		0.186	5.524242	0.061		transit	3150±80	0.95	5497	
Kepler-317c		0.153	8.77501	0.083		transit	3150±80	0.95	5497	
Kepler-318b		0.42	4.662715	0.056		transit	1618±10	1.05	5746	
Kepler-318c		0.328	11.815007	0.105		transit	1618±10	1.05	5746	
Kepler-319b		0.145	4.362705	0.051		transit	1666±15	1.29	5526	
Kepler-319c		0.235	6.941357	0.069		transit	1666±15	1.29	5526	
Kepler-319d		0.204	31.781925	0.191		transit	1666±15	1.29	5526	
Kepler-320b		0.102	8.371554	0.085		transit	2760±30		6435	
Kepler-320c		0.122	17.934937	0.142		transit	2760±30		6435	
Kepler-321b		0.158	4.915379	0.057		transit	1268±11	1.01	5740	
Kepler-321c		0.207	13.093921	0.11		transit	1268±11	1.01	5740	
Kepler-322b		0.09	1.653888	0.027		transit	1321±8	0.91	5388	
Kepler-322c		0.149	4.337234	0.051		transit	1321±8	0.91	5388	
Kepler-323b		0.128	1.678327	0.028		transit	1500±20	1.09	5987	
Kepler-323c		0.145	3.553822	0.046		transit	1500±20	1.09	5987	
Kepler-324b		0.102	4.385315	0.05		transit	1659±12	0.86	5194	
Kepler-324c		0.281	51.805612	0.26		transit	1659±12	0.86	5194	
Kepler-325b		0.26	4.544439	0.053		transit	2740±40	0.87	5752	
Kepler-325c		0.227	12.762172	0.105		transit	2740±40	0.87	5752	
Kepler-325d		0.249	38.715185	0.22		transit	2740±40	0.87	5752	
Kepler-326b		0.136	2.248329	0.032		transit	1610±30	0.98	5105	
Kepler-326c		0.125	4.580358	0.051		transit	1610±30	0.98	5105	
Kepler-326d		0.108	6.766888	0.066		transit	1610±30	0.98	5105	
Kepler-327b		0.099	2.549575	0.029		transit	794±4	0.55	3799	
Kepler-327c		0.092	5.212333	0.047		transit	794±4	0.55	3799	
Kepler-327d		0.154	13.969457	0.09		transit	794±4	0.55	3799	
Kepler-329b		0.125	7.416397	0.061		transit	1450±20	0.53	4257	
Kepler-329c		0.172	18.684737	0.113		transit	1450±20	0.53	4257	
Kepler-330b		0.12	8.25978	0.075		transit	2380±40	0.78	5117	
Kepler-330c		0.174	15.955387	0.116		transit	2380±40	0.78	5117	
Kepler-331b		0.162	8.457496	0.065		transit	1920±40	0.51	4347	
Kepler-331c		0.164	17.28111	0.105		transit	1920±40	0.51	4347	
Kepler-331d		0.146	32.134328	0.159		transit	1920±40	0.51	4347	
Kepler-332b		0.104	7.626324	0.07		transit	1133±5	0.8	4955	
Kepler-332c		0.097	15.995622	0.114		transit	1133±5	0.8	4955	
Kepler-332d		0.105	34.21154	0.189		transit	1133±5	0.8	4955	
Kepler-333b		0.118	12.551158	0.087		transit	1068±7	0.54	4259	
Kepler-333c		0.099	24.08821	0.135		transit	1068±7	0.54	4259	
Kepler-334b		0.1	5.470319	0.061		transit	1408±14	1	5828	
Kepler-334c		0.128	12.758005	0.107		transit	1408±14	1	5828	
Kepler-334d		0.126	25.09849	0.168		transit	1408±14	1	5828	
Kepler-335b		0.302	6.562331	0.075		transit	4320±100	0.99	5877	
Kepler-335c		0.274	67.844469	0.356		transit	4320±100	0.99	5877	
Kepler-336b		0.091	2.024823	0.033		transit	8000±7000	0.89	5867	
Kepler-336c		0.187	9.600001	0.092		transit	8000±7000	0.89	5867	
Kepler-336d		0.211	20.678772	0.154		transit	8000±7000	0.89	5867	
Kepler-337b		0.137	3.292781	0.045		transit	2250±30	0.96	5684	
Kepler-337c		0.183	9.693201	0.093		transit	2250±30	0.96	5684	
Kepler-338b		0.218	13.726976	0.117		transit	1830±20	1.1	5923	
Kepler-338c		0.209	24.310856	0.172		transit	1830±20	1.1	5923	
Kepler-338d		0.268	44.431014	0.257		transit	1830±20	1.1	5923	
Kepler-338e	0.027	0.139	9.341			timing	1830±20	1.1	5923	?
Kepler-339b		0.127	4.977656	0.055		transit	2040±30	0.84	5631	
Kepler-339c		0.103	6.988055	0.069		transit	2040±30	0.84	5631	
Kepler-339d		0.104	10.558345	0.091		transit	2040±30	0.84	5631	
Kepler-340b		0.226	14.844387	0.134		transit	2690±60	2.11	6620	
Kepler-340c		0.301	22.824669	0.178		transit	2690±60	2.11	6620	
Kepler-341b		0.105	5.195528	0.06		transit	3520±60	0.94	6012	
Kepler-341c		0.152	8.01041	0.08		transit	3520±60	0.94	6012	
Kepler-341d		0.165	27.666313	0.182		transit	3520±60	0.94	6012	
Kepler-341e		0.178	42.473269	0.242		transit	3520±60	0.94	6012	
Kepler-342b		0.201	15.170318	0.128		transit	2600±30	1.13	6175	
Kepler-342c		0.175	26.234138	0.185		transit	2600±30	1.13	6175	
Kepler-342d		0.222	39.459357	0.242		transit	2600±30	1.13	6175	
Kepler-343b		0.215	8.96855	0.088		transit	3100±60	1.04	5807	
Kepler-343c		0.18	23.22182	0.167		transit	3100±60	1.04	5807	
Kepler-344b		0.233	21.963945	0.153		transit	3360±100	0.9	5774	
Kepler-344c		0.263	125.596809	0.488		transit	3360±100	0.9	5774	
Kepler-345b		0.066	7.415563	0.066		transit	1180±50	0.59	4504	
Kepler-345c		0.107	9.387427	0.077		transit	1180±50	0.59	4504	
Kepler-346b		0.237	6.511127	0.071		transit	3300±80	0.97	6033	
Kepler-346c		0.274	23.851549	0.168		transit	3300±80	0.97	6033	
Kepler-347b		0.176	12.79836	0.11		transit	4400±90	1.04	6088	
Kepler-347c		0.156	27.320871	0.183		transit	4400±90	1.04	6088	
Kepler-348b		0.136	7.05677	0.076		transit	1890±20	1.15	6177	
Kepler-348c		0.119	17.265427	0.138		transit	1890±20	1.15	6177	
Kepler-349b		0.17	5.929778	0.065		transit	3150±60	0.97	5956	
Kepler-349c		0.175	12.247629	0.105		transit	3150±60	0.97	5956	
Kepler-350b		0.165	11.189562	0.104		transit	3200±60	1	6186	
Kepler-351b		0.273	37.054919	0.214		transit	3640±40	0.89	5643	
Kepler-351c		0.285	57.24809	0.287		transit	3640±40	0.89	5643	
Kepler-352b		0.077	10.05537	0.085		transit	830±4	0.79	5212	
Kepler-352c		0.111	16.332995	0.118		transit	830±4	0.79	5212	
Kepler-353b		0.079	5.795278	0.051		transit	1268±16	0.54	3903	
Kepler-353c		0.123	8.410894	0.065		transit	1268±16	0.54	3903	
Kepler-354b		0.164	5.47666	0.054		transit	1830±20	0.65	4648	
Kepler-354c		0.117	16.934402	0.115		transit	1830±20	0.65	4648	
Kepler-354d		0.111	24.209842	0.146		transit	1830±20	0.65	4648	
Kepler-355b		0.13	11.03189	0.102		transit	4870±160	1.05	6184	
Kepler-355c		0.242	25.762294	0.179		transit	4870±160	1.05	6184	
Kepler-356b		0.14	4.612696	0.057		transit	2350±30	0.97	6133	
Kepler-356c		0.161	13.121632	0.115		transit	2350±30	0.97	6133	
Kepler-357b		0.164	6.475434	0.063		transit	2290±40	0.78	5036	
Kepler-357c		0.238	16.85837	0.12		transit	2290±40	0.78	5036	
Kepler-357d		0.306	49.499875	0.246		transit	2290±40	0.78	5036	
Kepler-358b		0.243	34.060467	0.21		transit	3700±130	0.95	5908	
Kepler-358c		0.254	83.488369	0.381		transit	3700±130	0.95	5908	
Kepler-359b		0.315	25.563222	0.178		transit	4900±300	1.07	6248	
Kepler-359c		0.384	57.68802	0.307		transit	4900±300	1.07	6248	
Kepler-359d		0.358	77.095691	0.372		transit	4900±300	1.07	6248	
Kepler-360b		0.147	3.289672	0.044		transit	2930±50	0.95	6053	
Kepler-360c		0.187	7.186434	0.075		transit	2930±50	0.95	6053	
Kepler-361b		0.129	8.486616	0.086		transit	3110±50	1.07	6169	
Kepler-361c		0.225	55.188023	0.3		transit	3110±50	1.07	6169	
Kepler-362b		0.079	10.327186	0.087		transit	3660±180	0.77	5788	
Kepler-362c		0.129	37.866281	0.207		transit	3660±180	0.77	5788	
Kepler-363b		0.103	3.614568	0.048		transit	2540±20	1.23	5593	
Kepler-363c		0.151	7.542427	0.079		transit	2540±20	1.23	5593	
Kepler-363d		0.183	11.932125	0.107		transit	2540±20	1.23	5593	
Kepler-364b		0.138	25.745718	0.178		transit	2980±30	1.2	6108	
Kepler-364c		0.192	59.980627	0.312		transit	2980±30	1.2	6108	
Kepler-365b		0.182	10.664903	0.098		transit	2800±200	0.99	6012	
Kepler-365c		0.146	17.784129	0.137		transit	2800±200	0.99	6012	
Kepler-366b		0.13	3.281959	0.045		transit	6400±400	1.05	6209	
Kepler-366c		0.16	12.51616	0.11		transit	6400±400	1.05	6209	
Kepler-367b		0.116	37.815724	0.201		transit	616±2	0.75	4710	
Kepler-367c		0.107	53.578637	0.253		transit	616±2	0.75	4710	
Kepler-368b		0.291	26.84768	0.186		transit	2570±40	0.71	5502	
Kepler-368c		0.346	72.379334	0.36		transit	2570±40	0.71	5502	
Kepler-369b		0.101	2.732756	0.03		transit	840±120	0.54	3591	
Kepler-369c		0.126	14.871572	0.094		transit	840±120	0.54	3591	
Kepler-370b		0.142	4.57953	0.054		transit	3930±120	0.94	5852	
Kepler-370c		0.17	19.02293	0.14		transit	3930±120	0.94	5852	
Kepler-371b		0.169	34.763278	0.2		transit	2710±40	0.94	5666	
Kepler-371c		0.159	67.968015	0.313		transit	2710±40	0.94	5666	
Kepler-372b		0.121	6.849692	0.075		transit	5090±170	1.15	6509	
Kepler-372c		0.186	20.053763	0.154		transit	5090±170	1.15	6509	
Kepler-372d		0.151	30.092568	0.201		transit	5090±170	1.15	6509	
Kepler-373b		0.121	5.535309	0.06		transit	3670±70	0.87	5787	
Kepler-373c		0.111	16.725948	0.126		transit	3670±70	0.87	5787	
Kepler-374b		0.092	1.897806	0.029		transit	4280±120	0.84	5977	
Kepler-374c		0.098	3.282807	0.042		transit	4280±120	0.84	5977	
Kepler-374d		0.117	5.028219	0.056		transit	4280±120	0.84	5977	
Kepler-375b		0.129	12.125934	0.101		transit	4180±180	0.89	5826	
Kepler-375c		0.236	19.986326	0.141		transit	4180±180	0.89	5826	
Kepler-376b		0.095	4.920199	0.057		transit	3090±50	1.05	5900	
Kepler-376c		0.16	14.172327	0.115		transit	3090±50	1.05	5900	
Kepler-377b		0.124	12.509529	0.109		transit	2750±40	0.88	5949	
Kepler-377c		0.184	27.014976	0.182		transit	2750±40	0.88	5949	
Kepler-378b		0.067	16.092361	0.112		transit	498.3±1.4	0.96	4661	
Kepler-378c		0.062	28.906009	0.166		transit	498.3±1.4	0.96	4661	
Kepler-379b		0.148	20.09838	0.152		transit	2430±20	1.08	6054	
Kepler-379c		0.204	62.784697	0.326		transit	2430±20	1.08	6054	
Kepler-380b		0.106	3.930821	0.05		transit	2710±40	1.05	6045	
Kepler-380c		0.113	7.630004	0.078		transit	2710±40	1.05	6045	
Kepler-381b		0.088	5.629021	0.066		transit	878±5	1.34	6152	
Kepler-381c		0.1	13.391635	0.117		transit	878±5	1.34	6152	
Kepler-382b		0.118	5.262155	0.055		transit	3130±60	0.8	5600	
Kepler-382c		0.142	12.162701	0.097		transit	3130±60	0.8	5600	
Kepler-383b		0.118	12.904532	0.095		transit	1695	0.67	4710	
Kepler-383c		0.111	31.200751	0.172		transit	1695	0.67	4710	
Kepler-384b		0.1	22.597053	0.148		transit	2990±30	0.76	5577	
Kepler-384c		0.101	45.348269	0.236		transit	2990±30	0.76	5577	
Kepler-385b		0.244	10.043686	0.097		transit	4870±160	1.09	6326	
Kepler-385c		0.271	15.163161	0.127		transit	4870±160	1.09	6326	
Kepler-386b		0.124	12.31043	0.096		transit	2950±90	0.74	5178	
Kepler-386c		0.141	25.193458	0.155		transit	2950±90	0.74	5178	
Kepler-387b		0.092	6.791636	0.068		transit	2670±30	1.03	5774	
Kepler-387c		0.079	11.837549	0.098		transit	2670±30	1.03	5774	
Kepler-388b		0.072	3.173315	0.036		transit	2000±200	0.59	4498	
Kepler-388c		0.077	13.297004	0.093		transit	2000±200	0.59	4498	
Kepler-389b		0.135	3.244107	0.041		transit	2720±70	0.78	5376	
Kepler-389c		0.13	14.51143	0.11		transit	2720±70	0.78	5376	
Kepler-390b		0.073	6.738088	0.065		transit	1437±12	0.67	5166	
Kepler-390c		0.07	13.060022	0.101		transit	1437±12	0.67	5166	
Kepler-391b		0.285	7.416755	0.082		transit	2900±40	1.22	4940	
Kepler-391c		0.316	20.485435	0.161		transit	2900±40	1.22	4940	
Kepler-392b		0.089	5.341853	0.059		transit	2260±20	1.13	5938	
Kepler-392c		0.098	10.423118	0.093		transit	2260±20	1.13	5938	
Kepler-393b		0.115	9.182417	0.091		transit	2940±40	1.32	6189	
Kepler-393c		0.119	14.613612	0.124		transit	2940±40	1.32	6189	
Kepler-394b		0.143	8.005013	0.083		transit	3560±80	1.11	6402	
Kepler-394c		0.148	12.130686	0.11		transit	3560±80	1.11	6402	
Kepler-395b		0.092	7.054346	0.061		transit	1390±20	0.53	4262	
Kepler-395c		0.118	34.989262	0.177		transit	1390±20	0.53	4262	Potentially habitable exoplanet
Kepler-397b		0.219	22.250949	0.144		transit	3760		5307	
Kepler-397c		0.551	135.498527	0.48		transit	3760		5307	
Kepler-398b		0.083	4.081423	0.044		transit	581.4±1.8		4493	
Kepler-398c		0.09	11.419412	0.087		transit	581.4±1.8		4493	
Kepler-399b		0.086	14.425281	0.103		transit	4400±700		5502	
Kepler-399c		0.128	26.67569	0.155		transit	4400±700		5502	
Kepler-399d		0.169	58.034616	0.261		transit	4400±700		5502	
Kepler-400b		0.147	9.024389	0.087		transit	2340		5886	
Kepler-400c		0.133	17.340824	0.134		transit	2340		5886	
Kepler-401b		0.153	14.383035	0.122		transit	3230±50		6117	
Kepler-401c		0.192	47.318218	0.269		transit	3230±50		6117	
Kepler-402b		0.109	4.028751	0.051		transit	2070±20		6090	
Kepler-402c		0.139	6.124821	0.068		transit	2070±20		6090	
Kepler-402d		0.123	8.921099	0.087		transit	2070±20		6090	
Kepler-402e		0.13	11.242861	0.102		transit	2070±20		6090	
Kepler-403b		0.112	7.031462	0.076		transit	2800±50		6090	
Kepler-403c		0.156	54.280749	0.297		transit	2800±50		6090	
Kepler-404b		0.113	11.829851	0.102		transit	2710±40		5654	
Kepler-404c		0.153	14.751166	0.118		transit	2710±40		5654	
Kepler-405b		0.186	10.613839	0.095		transit	3570±140		5818	
Kepler-405c		0.416	29.726682	0.188		transit	3570±140		5818	
Kepler-406b	0.02	0.128	2.42629			transit	1199±11	1.07	5538	
Kepler-406c	0.009	0.076	4.62332			transit	1199±11	1.07	5538	
Kepler-407b		0.095	0.66931			transit	1114±8	1	5476	
Kepler-407c	12.6		3000			radial vel.	1114±8	1	5476	
Kepler-408b		0.073	2.46502			transit	290.3±0.9	1.08	6104	Host star known as HD 176693 or KOI-1612. Reported as 2.1% false positive probable in 2014, but confirmed by 2016.
Kepler-409b		0.106	68.9584			transit	222.8±0.3	0.92	5460	
Kepler-412b	0.941	1.341	1.7208604	0.02897		transit	3650±60	1.17	5750	
Kepler-413b	0.211	0.388	66.262	0.3553		transit	2830±70	0.82	4700	
Kepler-414b	0.011	0.153	4.7			timing	1364±9	0.89		
Kepler-414c	0.094	0.269	7.171			timing	1364±9	0.89		
Kepler-415b	0.377	0.108	4.176			timing	1750±30	0.67		
Kepler-415c			8.708			transit	1750±30	0.67		?
Kepler-416b	0.183	0.221	6.319			timing	2290±30	1		
Kepler-416c			12.209			transit	2290±30	1		?
Kepler-417b	0.035	0.206	12.331			transit	3250±150	0.9		
Kepler-417c			15.943			transit	3250±150	0.9		?
Kepler-418b	1.1	1.2	86.67856			transit	3360±60	0.98	5820	
Kepler-419b	2.5	0.96	69.7546	0.37		transit	3390±80	1.39	6430	
Kepler-419c	7.3		675.47	1.68		timing	3390±80	1.39	6430	
Kepler-420Ab	1.45	0.94	86.647661	0.382	511	transit	2900	0.99	5520	
Kepler-421b		0.371	704.1984	1.219		transit	1148±6	0.79	5308	
Kepler-422b	0.43	1.15	7.8914483	0.082		transit	2400±20	1.15	5972	
Kepler-423b	0.595	1.192	2.6843285	0.03585	1605	transit	2520±40	0.85	5560	
Kepler-424b	1.03	0.89	3.3118644	0.044		transit	2320±30	1.01	5460	
Kepler-424c	6.97		223.3	0.73		radial vel.	2320±30	1.01	5460	
Kepler-425b	0.25	0.978	3.79701816	0.0464	1070	transit	2140±30	0.93	5170	
Kepler-426b	0.34	1.09	3.21751883	0.0414	1300	transit	2810±40	0.91	5725	
Kepler-427b	0.29	1.23	10.290994	0.091	1100	transit	3410±50	0.96	5800	
Kepler-428b	1.27	1.08	3.52563254	0.0433	1070	transit	2280±50	0.87	5150	
Kepler-430b		0.29	35.968	0.2244	667	transit	3070±50	1.17	5884	
Kepler-430c		0.16	110.979	0.4757	458	transit	3070±50	1.17	5884	
Kepler-431b		0.068	6.803	0.0719	1032	transit	1609±15	1.07	6004	
Kepler-431c		0.06	8.703	0.0847	951	transit	1609±15	1.07	6004	
Kepler-431d		0.1	11.922	0.1045	856	transit	1609±15	1.07	6004	
Kepler-432b	5.41	1.145	52.501129	0.301		transit	2830±60	1.32	4995	Eccentric orbit
Kepler-432c	2.43^{+0.22}_{−0.24}		406.2^{+3.9}_{−2.5}			radial vel.	2830±60	1.32	4995	
Kepler-453b	0.00063	0.553	240.503	0.7903		transit	1463±9	0.94	5527	
Mu Leonis b	2.4		357.8	1.1		radial vel.	133.0	1.5	4538.2	
OGLE-2008-BLG-355Lb	4.6			1.7		microlensing	22000	0.37		
OGLE-2008-BLG-92Lb	0.18			18		microlensing	26000	0.71		
OGLE-2011-BLG-265Lb	0.88			1.89		microlensing	14300	0.21		
OGLE-2013-BLG-102Lb	12.569			0.8		microlensing	9900	0.1		Additional planet or brown dwarf in the system.
OGLE-2013-BLG-341LBb	0.0073			0.883		microlensing	3790	0.15		One more red dwarf in the system.
OGLE-2014-BLG-0124Lb	0.51			3.11		microlensing	13000	0.71		
SAND364 b	1.54		121.71			radial vel.	2730±130	1.35	4284	Belongs to Messier 67, also known as BD+12 1917b
TYC 1422-614-1 b	2.5		198.4	0.69		radial vel.	2480	1.15	4806	
TYC 1422-614-1 c	10		559.3	1.37		radial vel.	2480	1.15	4806	
WASP-20 A b	0.72±0,06	1.32±0.03	3.16158	0.04317		transit	663.39	1.05	5990	Binary with planet orbiting primary star
WASP-74b	0.95	1.56	2.13775	0.037	1910	transit	390	1.48	5970	
WASP-83b	0.3	1.04	4.971252	0.059	1120	transit	980	1.11	5510	
WASP-85Ab	1.265	1.24	2.6556777	0.039	1452	transit	243	1.09	6112	
WASP-87 b	2.18±0.15	1.39±0.06	1.6828	0.0295±0.0008		transit	982±12	1.20±0.09	6450±120	Host star also known as CD-52 4998.
WASP-89b	5.9	1.04	3.3564227	0.0427	1120	transit	957	0.92	5130	
WASP-94Ab	0.452	1.72	3.9501907	0.055	1604	transit	590	1.45	6153	
WASP-94Bb	0.618		2.00839	0.0335		radial vel.	590	1.24	6040	
WASP-103b	1.49	1.528	0.925542	0.01985	2508	transit	1500	1.22	6110	Planet close to tidal disruption
WASP-104b	1.272	1.137	1.7554137	0.02918	1516	transit	470	1.08	5475	
WASP-106b	1.925	1.085	9.289715	0.0917	1140	transit	920	1.19	6055	
WASP-108 b	1.167^{+0.092}_{−0.091}	1.215±0.040	2.6755463±0.0000021	0.0397±0.001	1590	transit	717.6±0.3	1.167±0.092	6000±140	Host star also known as TYC 8254-1624-1
WASP-109 b	0.91±0.13	1.443±0.053	3.3190233±0.0000042	0.0463±0.0011	1695	transit	1173±16	1.203±0.090	6520±140	Host star also known as TYC 6184-1397-1
WASP-110 b	0.515±0.064	1.238±0.056	3.7783977±0.0000031	0.0457±0.0012	1134	transit	904±10	0.892±0.072	5400±140	
WASP-111 b	1.85±0.16	1.442±0.094	2.310965±0.0000034	0.03914±0.00098	2140	transit	980±20	1.50±0.11	6400±150	Host star also known as HD 208180
WASP-112 b	0.88±0.12	1.191±0.049	3.0353992±0.0000038	0.0382±0.0011	1395	transit	1900±40	0.807±0.073	5610±130	
WASP-116b	0.59±0.05	1.43±0.07	6.61321±0.00002	0.0730±0.0011	1400±4	transit	1770±60	1.25±0.18	5950±100	
WASP-117b	0.2755	1.021	10.02165	0.09459	1024	transit	518±2	1.13	6038	
WASP-149b	1.02±0.04	1.32±0.04	1.332811±0.000001	0.0247±0.0004	1870±1	transit	1770±60	1.12±0.17	5750±100	
XO-2Sb	0.259		18.157	0.1344		radial vel.	480	0.98	5399	
XO-2Sc	1.37		120.8	0.4756		radial vel.	480	0.98	5399	
YBP 1194 b	0.32		6.959			radial vel.	2920±100	1.01	5780	Belongs to Messier 67
YBP 1514 b	0.4		5.118			radial vel.	3060±100	0.96	5725	Belongs to Messier 67

== Specific exoplanet lists ==
Lists of exoplanets

- List of directly imaged exoplanets
- List of exoplanet extremes
- List of exoplanet firsts
- List of exoplanets discovered by the Kepler space telescope
- List of exoplanets observed during Kepler's K2 mission
- List of exoplanets discovered by the TESS mission
- List of extrasolar candidates for liquid water
- List of terrestrial exoplanet candidates for atmosphere detection
- List of hottest exoplanets
- List of coldest exoplanets
- List of multiplanetary systems
- List of circumbinary planets
- List of nearest exoplanets
- List of nearest terrestrial exoplanet candidates
- List of potentially habitable exoplanets
- List of proper names of exoplanets
- List of largest exoplanets
- List of smallest exoplanets
- List of transiting exoplanets
- List of exoplanets and planetary debris around giant stars
- List of exoplanets and planetary debris around white dwarfs
- List of extrasolar planetary collisions

=== Lists of exoplanets by year of discovery ===
- List of exoplanets discovered before 2000 (31)
- List of exoplanets discovered between 2000–2009 (375)
- List of exoplanets discovered in 2010 (109)
- List of exoplanets discovered in 2011 (179)
- List of exoplanets discovered in 2012 (149)
- List of exoplanets discovered in 2013 (149)
- List of exoplanets discovered in 2014 (869)
- List of exoplanets discovered in 2015 (144)
- List of exoplanets discovered in 2016 (1498)
- List of exoplanets discovered in 2017 (152)
- List of exoplanets discovered in 2018 (300)
- List of exoplanets discovered in 2019 (169)
- List of exoplanets discovered in 2020 (256)
- List of exoplanets discovered in 2021 (253)
- List of exoplanets discovered in 2022 (312)
- List of exoplanets discovered in 2023 (304)
- List of exoplanets discovered in 2024 (284)
- List of exoplanets discovered in 2025 (138)
- List of exoplanets discovered in 2026 (158)
