= Kepler-419 =

Star in the constellation Cygnus

Observation data Epoch J2000 Equinox J2000
- Constellation: Cygnus
- Right ascension: 19^{h} 41^{m} 40.2991^{s}
- Declination: +51° 11′ 05.168″
- Apparent magnitude (V): 13.036±0.006

Characteristics
- Evolutionary stage: Main sequence
- Spectral type: F
- Apparent magnitude (B): 13.498±0.011

Astrometry
| Proper motion (μ) | RA: −0.068(16) mas/yr Dec.: −1.423(16) mas/yr |
| Parallax (π) | 0.9932±0.0126 mas |
| Distance | 3,280 ± 40 ly (1,010 ± 10 pc) |

Details
| Mass | 1.40+0.06 −0.08 M_{☉} |
| Radius | 1.57+0.20 −0.18 R_{☉} |
| Luminosity | 2.7+1.6 −0.8 L_{☉} |
| Surface gravity (log g) | 4.19±0.09 cgs |
| Temperature | 6421+76 −80 K |
| Metallicity [Fe/H] | 0.16+0.08 −0.04 dex |
| Rotation | 4.492±0.012 days |
| Rotational velocity (v sin i) | 14.41±1.3 km/s |
| Age | 2.8+1.3 −1.2 Gyr |

Other designations
- KOI-1474, KIC 12365184, 2MASS J19414029+5111051

Database references
| SIMBAD | data |

Kepler-419 is an F-type main-sequence star located about 3,280 light years from Earth in the constellation Cygnus. It is located within the field of vision of the Kepler spacecraft, the satellite that NASA's Kepler Mission used to detect planets that may be transiting their stars. In 2012, a potential planetary companion in a very eccentric orbit was detected around this star, but its planetary nature was not confirmed until 12 June 2014, when it was named Kepler-419b. A second planet was announced orbiting further out from the star in the same paper, named Kepler-419c.

== Nomenclature and history ==
Prior to Kepler observation, Kepler-419 had the 2MASS catalogue number 2MASS J19414029+5111051. In the Kepler Input Catalog it has the designation of KIC 12365184, and when it was found to have transiting planet candidates it was given the Kepler object of interest number of KOI-1474.

The star's planets were discovered by NASA's Kepler Mission, a mission tasked with discovering planets in transit around their stars. The transit method that Kepler uses involves detecting dips in brightness in stars. These dips in brightness can be interpreted as planets whose orbits move in front of their stars from the perspective of Earth. The name Kepler-419 derives directly from the fact that the star is the catalogued 419th star discovered by Kepler to have confirmed planets.

The designation b and c, derive from the order of discovery. The designation of b is given to the first planet orbiting a given star, and c to the furthest. In the case of Kepler-419, there were two planets detected, so the letters b and c are used.

== Stellar characteristics ==
Kepler-419 is an F-type star that is approximately 139% the mass of and 175% the radius of the Sun. It has a surface temperature of 6430 K and is 2.8 billion years old. In comparison, the Sun is about 4.6 billion years old and has a surface temperature of 5778 K.

The star's apparent magnitude, or how bright it appears from Earth's perspective, is 14. Therefore, it is too dim to be seen with the naked eye.

== Planetary system ==
The Kepler-419 planetary system
| Companion (in order from star) | Mass | Semimajor axis (AU) | Orbital period (days) | Eccentricity | Inclination | Radius |
|---|---|---|---|---|---|---|
| b | 2.77±0.19 M_{J} | 0.3745±0.0046 | 69.7960±0.0042 | 0.817±0.016 | 87.04±0.72° | 1.120±0.084 R_{J} |
| c | 7.65±0.27 M_{J} | 1.697±0.020 | 673.35±0.84 | 0.1793±0.0017 | 87.0±2.0° | 1.13 R_{J} |

Only the first planet is known transit the star; this means that the planet's orbit appear to cross in front of their star as viewed from the Earth's perspective. Its inclination relative to Earth's line of sight, or how far above or below the plane of sight it is, vary by less than one degree. This allows direct measurements of the planet's periods and relative diameters (compared to the host star) by monitoring the planet's transit of the star.

The innermost planet orbits the star every 69 days at a distance nearly the same as the Mercury–Sun distance, which Kepler-419b orbits at 0.37 AU. It has a very eccentric orbit, and as such experiences large temperature swings as its eccentricity is 0.83. The eccentric orbit could not have been caused by the star itself, there must have been a more distant companion. In 2014 the discovery of a 7.3 M_{J} planet orbiting at 1.68 AU was announced, through the transit-timing variations method.

Kepler-419c is notable because it orbits within its star's habitable zone, and, even though it has a mass 7 times that of Jupiter, it is listed as a good candidate for potentially harboring a habitable exomoon. Because of this, some astronomers have begun taking interest in Kepler-419c to search for these potentially habitable exomoons. As of 2022, no exomoons have been detected in orbit around the planet.

== See also ==
- Kepler Mission
- List of planetary systems
