= Kepler-421 =

Yellow main-sequence star

Observation data Epoch J2000 Equinox J2000
- Constellation: Lyra
- Right ascension: 18^{h} 53^{m} 01.6405^{s}
- Declination: 45° 5′ 15.977″
- Apparent magnitude (V): 13.56±0.04

Characteristics
- Evolutionary stage: main sequence
- Spectral type: G7V or K9V

Astrometry
Proper motion (μ)	RA: −3.889(18) mas/yr Dec.: −20.675(19) mas/yr
Parallax (π)	2.9019±0.0151 mas
Distance	1,124 ± 6 ly (345 ± 2 pc)

Details
Mass	0.76 M_{☉}
Radius	0.83^{+0.04}_{−0.03} R_{☉}
Luminosity	0.451 L_{☉}
Surface gravity (log g)	4.54 cgs
Temperature	5,308±50 K
Metallicity [Fe/H]	−0.25±0.08 dex
Rotation	28.5±0.3 d
Rotational velocity (v sin i)	1.5±0.5 km/s
Age	14.38 Gyr

Other designations
- KOI-1274, KIC 8800954, 2MASS J18530163+4505159, Gaia DR2 2106891671567353728

Database references
SIMBAD	data
KIC	data

Kepler-421 (KOI-1274 A) is a yellow main sequence star, being of spectral class G7V. Orange star of spectral class K9V (KOI-1274 B), projected on sky plane just 1.085″ away, is not physically associated to it. The distance to star KOI-1274 A is approximately 1150 light-years, and to KOI-1274 B is about 1900 light-years.

== Planetary system ==
Kepler-421 has an exoplanet (Kepler-421b), which is notable for its position near the snow line.

The Kepler-421 planetary system
Companion (in order from star)	Mass	Semimajor axis (AU)	Orbital period (days)	Eccentricity	Inclination	Radius
b	—	1.219^{+0.089}_{−0.106}	704.20±0.01	0.041^{+0.095}_{−0.034}	89.965^{+0.024}_{−0.031}°	0.411^{+0.021}_{−0.016} R_{J}
