= TOI-677 b =

Tess Object in the constellation Ophiuchus

Discovery
- Discovery site: Transiting Exoplanet Survey Satellite
- Discovery date: 2019
- Detection method: Transit method

Orbital characteristics
- Semi-major axis: 0.1038 AU (15,530,000 km)
- Orbital period (sidereal): 11.24 d
- Inclination: 87.63
- Star: TOI-677

Physical characteristics
- Mean radius: 1.170 R_{J}
- Mass: 1.236 M_{J}
- Temperature: 1,252 K (979 °C; 1,794 °F)

TOI-677 b (TOI-677b) is a warm super-Jupiter type exoplanet orbiting the F-type main sequence star TOI-677 in the constellation of Ophiuchus about 466 ly (143 pc) away from Earth. The mass of the planet has been found to be 1.252 Jupiter masses and the radius of the planet is 1.179 Jupiter radii. It has a temperature of 1,252 K (979 °C; 1,794 °F). It orbits the star once every 11.24 days in an eccentric orbit (e=0.435). The eccentricity of TOI-677b is possibly due to interactions between the protoplanetary disk and the planet itself. If the claims of an outer brown dwarf object in the TOI-677 system are true, then the brown dwarf may have had a role in the planets high eccentricity.

It is part of a emerging class of exoplanets called tidally detached gas giants that exhibits high eccentricities but low stellar obliquity. It is also part of a class of planetary systems with eccentric super-Jupiters orbiting stars hotter than 6100 Kelvin.

== Discovery ==
The planet was discovered by NASA's Transiting Exoplanet Survey Satellite (TESS) using the transit method, in which the dimming effect that a planet causes as it crosses in front of its star is measured. Discovery of the exoplanet was announced on 13 November 2019.

== See also ==
- 55 Cancri b
- Hot Jupiter
- Kepler-432b
