= Kepler-371 =

Star in the constellation Cygnus

Observation data Epoch J2000 Equinox J2000
- Constellation: Cygnus
- Right ascension: 19^{h} 29^{m} 18.3513^{s}
- Declination: +38° 39′ 27.273″
- Apparent magnitude (V): 14.0

Characteristics
- Evolutionary stage: subgiant
- Spectral type: G4V

Astrometry
Proper motion (μ)	RA: 3.560(12) mas/yr Dec.: −7.358(14) mas/yr
Parallax (π)	1.2177±0.0121 mas
Distance	2,680 ± 30 ly (821 ± 8 pc)

Details
Mass	0.93±0.05 M_{☉}
Radius	1.3 R_{☉}
Luminosity	1.6 L_{☉}
Surface gravity (log g)	4.20 cgs
Temperature	5,759+70 −87 K
Metallicity [Fe/H]	−0.25 dex
Rotation	149 days
Rotational velocity (v sin i)	2.0 km/s
Age	5.5 Gyr

Other designations
- Gaia DR2 2052702348375966208, KOI-2194, KIC 3548044, 2MASS J19291835+3839273

Database references
SIMBAD	data
Exoplanet Archive	data

Kepler-371 (also known as KOI-2194 or KIC 3548044) is a star some 2,680 ly away from the Earth. It hosts a multi planetary system consisting of 2 confirmed Super-Earths, as well as 1 unconfirmed Near-Earth sized exoplanet in its habitable zone.

The Kepler-371 planetary system
Companion (in order from star)	Mass	Semimajor axis (AU)	Orbital period (days)	Eccentricity	Inclination	Radius
b	—	0.2	34.763278±0.000351	0	89.95°	1.89 R_{🜨}
c	—	0.313	67.968015	0	89.95°	1.78 R_{🜨}
d (unconfirmed)	—	—	—	—	—	—
