= Kepler-419c =

Super-Jupiter exoplanet orbiting Kepler-419

Discovery
- Discovered by: Kepler spacecraft
- Discovery date: 12 June 2014
- Detection method: Transit timing variations

Orbital characteristics
- Semi-major axis: 1.68 (± 0.03) AU
- Eccentricity: 0.184 (± 0.002)
- Orbital period (sidereal): 675.47 (± 0.11) d
- Inclination: 88+3 −2
- Star: Kepler-419 (KOI-1474)

Physical characteristics
- Mean radius: 1.13 R_{J}
- Mass: 7.3 ± 0.4 M_{J}
- Temperature: 250 K (−23 °C; −10 °F)

Kepler-419c (also known by its Kepler Object of Interest designation KOI-1474.02) is a super-Jupiter exoplanet orbiting within the habitable zone of the star Kepler-419, the outermost of two such planets discovered by NASA's Kepler spacecraft. It is located about 3,400 light-years (1040 parsecs )from Earth in the constellation Cygnus. The exoplanet was found by using the transit timing variation method, in which the variations of transit data from an exoplanet are studied to reveal a more distant companion.

== Physical characteristics ==
=== Mass, radius and temperature ===
Kepler-419c is a super-Jupiter, an exoplanet that has a radius and mass greater than that of the planet Jupiter. It has a temperature of 250 K (−23 °C; −10 °F), somewhat cooler than the equilibrium temperature of the Earth. It has a mass of 7.2 M_{J}, and a likely radius of around 1.13 R_{J}, based on its high mass.

=== Host star ===
The planet orbits an (F-type) star named Kepler-419. The star has a mass of 1.39 M_{☉} and a radius of 1.75 R_{☉}. It has a surface temperature of 6430 K and is 2.8 billion years old. In comparison, the Sun is about 4.6 billion years old and has a surface temperature of 5778 K.

The star's apparent magnitude, or how bright it appears from Earth's perspective, is 12. It is too dim to be seen with the naked eye.

=== Orbit ===
Kepler-419c orbits its host star with 270% of the Sun's luminosity (2.7 L_{☉}) about every 675 days (around 1.84 years) at a distance of 1.61 AU (compared to the orbital distance of Mars, which is 1.52 AU). It has a slightly eccentric orbit, with an eccentricity of 0.184. It receives about 95% of the amount of sunlight that Earth does.

== Habitability ==
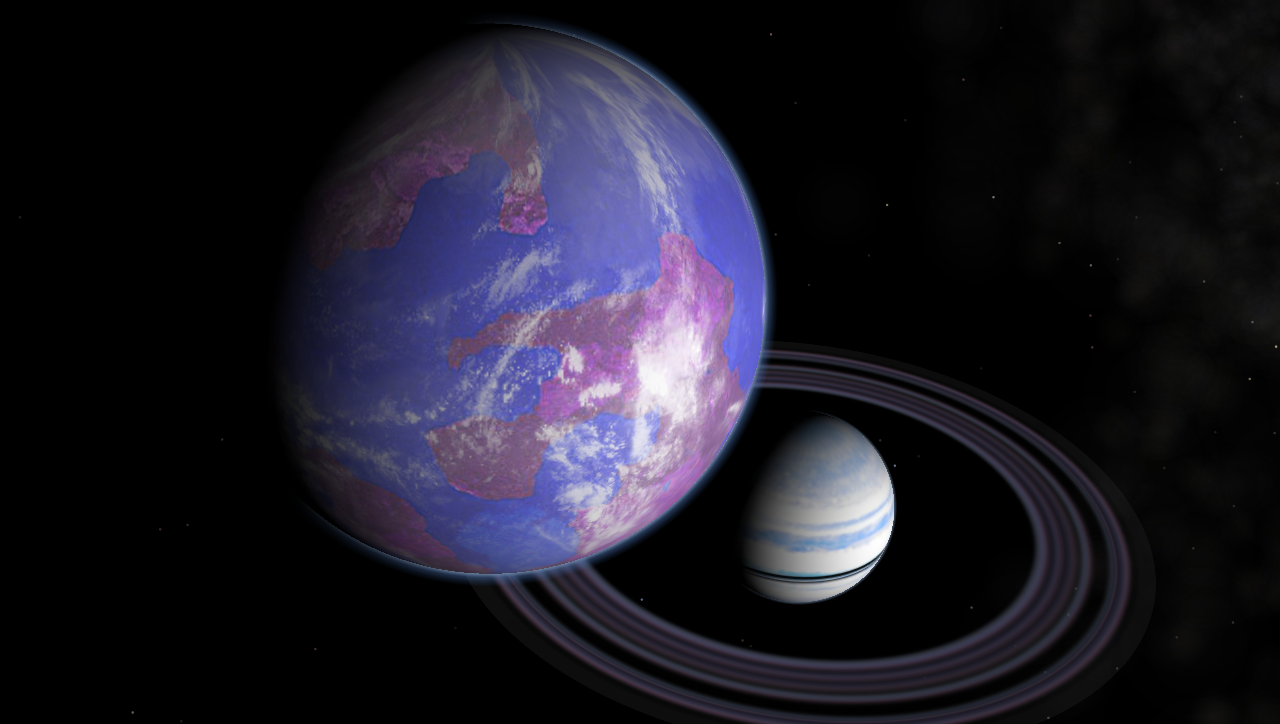
Artist's impression of a hypothetical moon around a Saturn-like exoplanet that could be habitable.

Kepler-419c resides in the circumstellar habitable zone of the parent star. The exoplanet, with a mass of 7.28 M_{J}, is too massive to be rocky, and because of this the planet itself is probably not habitable. However, Kepler-419c is listed as one of the candidates that may harbor potentially habitable moons, where, with the right atmospheric pressure and temperature, liquid water might exist on the surface of the moon.

Hypothetically, for a stable orbit the ratio between the moon's orbital period P_{s} around its primary and that of the primary around its star P_{p} must be < 1/9, e.g. if a planet takes 90 days to orbit its star, the maximum stable orbit for a moon of that planet is less than 10 days. Simulations suggest that a moon with an orbital period less than about 45 to 60 days will remain safely bound to a massive giant planet or brown dwarf that orbits 1 AU from a Sun-like star. In the case of Kepler-419c, this would be practically the same to have a stable orbit, albeit a bit longer, around 65 days.

== Discovery ==
In 2009, NASA's Kepler spacecraft was completing observing stars on its photometer, the instrument it uses to detect transit events, in which a planet crosses in front of and dims its host star for a brief and roughly regular period of time. In this last test, Kepler observed 50000 stars in the Kepler Input Catalog, including Kepler-419, the preliminary light curves were sent to the Kepler science team for analysis, who chose obvious planetary companions from the bunch for follow-up at observatories. Observations for the potential exoplanet candidates took place between 13 May 2009 and 17 March 2012. After observing the respective transits, the first planet, Kepler-419b, was announced.

Further investigations were made into the transit data of Kepler-419b, which was shown to be varying slightly, caused by a more distant orbiting planet. Data revealed that the responsible companion was about 7.3 times more massive than Jupiter and orbiting at a distance of 1.68 AU. The discovery was then announced on June 12, 2014.

== See also ==
- Kepler-47c
- HD 69830 d
- Kepler-90h
