= Kepler-167e =

Jupiter analogue exoplanet

Kepler-167 Ae
- Artist's impression of a gas giant representing Kepler-167e

Discovery
- Discovery date: 29 Feb 2016

Orbital characteristics
- Semi-major axis: 1.883±0.027 AU
- Eccentricity: 0.062+0.104 −0.043
- Orbital period (sidereal): 1071.23205+0.00059 −0.00058
- Inclination: 89.9720+0.0069 −0.0079
- Star: Kepler-167

Physical characteristics
- Mean radius: 0.9064±0.0375 R_{J}
- Mass: 1.01+0.16 −0.15 M_{J}
- Mean density: 1.68+0.34 −0.33
- Synodic rotation period: ≥7.11 hours
- Temperature: 131 K (−142 °C)

Kepler-167e, also known as KOI-490.02, is a Jupiter analogue exoplanet 1,119 light years from the Sun orbiting the K-type main sequence star Kepler-167 A. Discovered in 2016, Kepler-167e is the fourth planet discovered in its system and has the longest orbital period; all four planets are orbiting Kepler-167 A. Kepler-167e has a mass 1% more than Jupiter and is about 10% smaller in radius, making it an extremely close Jupiter analogue. It is the first known Jupiter analogue to be discovered via the transit method. It is also believed to orbit beyond its star's snowline, and, unlike many other giant planets, has almost no variation in orbital period.

== Composition ==
Observations of the planet with the Spitzer space telescope found that the atmosphere of Kepler-167e shows signs of containing water, ammonia, and methane, but more research is needed to definitively confirm the presence of those compounds. It is estimated to contain 66±19 Earth masses worth of solids, with a much higher metallicity than its host star.

== Transit ==
In 2022, it was found that Kepler-167 Ae took 16 hours to transit its star.

== Rotational period ==
In 2025 it was found that Kepler-167 Ae had a 95% chance of have in a rotational period or day of over 7.11 hours based on its oblateness of f < 0.097. This means the planet's equatorial radius can be, at most, roughly 9.7% wider than its polar radius.

== Possible Exomoon ==
In 2026, two papers led by David Kipping came out using JWST data. During a transit, the planet showed a second dip that could be explained by an exomoon roughly 0.81 to 0.95 times the size of Earth. However, if the moon is real, it would be orbiting extremely close to, or just skimming, the Roche limit.
