= Kepler-167 =

Star in the constellation Cygnus

Observation data Epoch J2000 Equinox ICRS
- Constellation: Cygnus
- Right ascension: 19^{h} 30^{m} 38.02619^{s}
- Declination: +38° 20′ 43.4372″
- Apparent magnitude (V): 14.284±0.126

Characteristics
- Evolutionary stage: Main sequence
- Spectral type: K3-K4
- Apparent magnitude (G): 13.988±0.003
- Apparent magnitude (J): 12.446±0.022
- Apparent magnitude (H): 11.974±0.023
- Apparent magnitude (K): 11.832±0.022

Astrometry
Radial velocity (R_{v})	−26.79±2.21 km/s
Proper motion (μ)	RA: 15.097 mas/yr Dec.: 36.352 mas/yr
Parallax (π)	2.9157±0.0131 mas
Distance	1,119 ± 5 ly (343 ± 2 pc)
Absolute magnitude (M_{V})	6.53±0.12

Details
Mass	0.777+0.034 −0.031 M_{☉}
Radius	0.749±0.020 R_{☉}
Luminosity (bolometric)	0.289+0.017 −0.020 L_{☉}
Surface gravity (log g)	4.579+0.027 −0.025 cgs
Temperature	4884+69 −75 K
Metallicity [Fe/H]	0.020±0.067 dex
Rotational velocity (v sin i)	<2 km/s
Age	7.1+4.4 −4.6 Gyr

Other designations
- Kepler-167, KOI-490, KIC 3239945, TIC 137686948, 2MASS J19303802+3820434

Database references
SIMBAD	data
Exoplanet Archive	data

Kepler-167 is a K-type main-sequence star located about 1,119 light-years (343 pc) away from the Solar System in the constellation of Cygnus. The star has about 78% the mass and 75% the radius of the Sun, and a temperature of 4,884 K (4,611 °C; 8,332 °F). It hosts a system of four known exoplanets. There is also a companion red dwarf star at a separation of about 700 AU, with an estimated orbital period of over 15,000 years.

== Planetary system ==
Kepler-167 is orbited by four known transiting exoplanets, discovered using the Kepler space telescope. The inner three planets are all super-Earths of unknown composition orbiting closer to their star than Mercury is to the Sun. The outermost planet, Kepler-167e, is a Jupiter analog, with 0.91 R_{J}, 1.01 M_{J}, and an equilibrium temperature of 134 K (−139 °C; −218 °F). It is the first transiting Jupiter analog discovered.

The inner two planets were confirmed in 2014, as part of a study validating hundreds of Kepler planets, and the outer two planets were confirmed in 2016. Observations of Kepler-167e using the Spitzer Space Telescope, published in 2019, ruled out significant transit timing variations, making it easier to predict future transits and plan follow-up observations. As a rare example of a long-period transiting gas giant, Kepler-167e is a target of interest for further observations, for example to characterize its atmosphere. As of 2022, four transits of planet e have been detected, with both space-based and ground-based observations.

In 2025, there was a search of exomoons around the exoplanet Kepler-167e by astronomer David Kipping and his team using JWST with some results but no conclusion was reached. One candidate event, which would give an orbit close to the Roche limit, may be better modeled as the planet passing in front of a starspot; no conclusion can be reached until the next transit in October 2027.

The Kepler-167 planetary system
Companion (in order from star)	Mass	Semimajor axis (AU)	Orbital period (days)	Eccentricity	Inclination (°)	Radius
b	—	0.04825±0.00070	4.3931539+0.0000048 −0.0000046	0	88.3+1.6 −1.2	1.718±0.070 R_{🜨}
c	—	0.0684±0.0010	7.406106±0.000010	0	88.48+0.88 −1.0	1.674±0.069 R_{🜨}
d	—	0.1404±0.0020	21.80379+0.00013 −0.00018	0	89.26±0.50	1.238±0.064 R_{🜨}
e	1.01+0.16 −0.15 M_{J}	1.883±0.027	1071.23205+0.00059 −0.00058	0.062+0.104 −0.043	89.9720+0.0069 −0.0079	0.9064±0.0375 R_{J}
