= Kepler-174 =

Main sequence star in constellation of Lyra

Observation data Epoch J2000 Equinox ICRS
- Constellation: Lyra
- Right ascension: 19^{h} 09^{m} 45.40270^{s}
- Declination: +43° 49′ 55.4994″
- Apparent magnitude (V): 14.530±0.057

Characteristics
- Evolutionary stage: Main sequence
- Spectral type: K5
- Apparent magnitude (G): 14.274±0.003
- Apparent magnitude (J): 12.791±0.021
- Apparent magnitude (H): 12.293±0.021
- Apparent magnitude (K): 12.184±0.018

Astrometry
| Radial velocity (R_{v}) | −101.06±3.94 km/s |
| Proper motion (μ) | RA: −38.959±0.016 mas/yr Dec.: −18.117±0.017 mas/yr |
| Parallax (π) | 2.6013±0.0142 mas |
| Distance | 1,254 ± 7 ly (384 ± 2 pc) |

Details
| Mass | 0.710+0.041 −0.036 M_{☉} |
| Radius | 0.680+0.032 −0.028 R_{☉} |
| Luminosity | 0.196 L_{☉} |
| Surface gravity (log g) | 4.630+0.024 −0.030 cgs |
| Temperature | 4724.0±25.0 K |
| Metallicity [Fe/H] | −0.360±0.124 dex |
| Rotation | 43.7 days |
| Rotational velocity (v sin i) | 1.2 km/s |
| Age | 4.900+5.260 −3.140 Gyr |

Other designations
- Kepler-174, KOI-518, KIC 8017703, TIC 158434144, 2MASS J19094540+4349555

Database references
| SIMBAD | data |
| Exoplanet Archive | data |

Kepler-174 is a K-type main-sequence star located in the Milky Way galaxy at a distance of about 1,254 light-years (384 parsecs) away from the Sun. It is located inside the boundaries of the constellation Lyra, but it is too dim to be visible to the unaided eye and is not part of the main outline.

== Planetary system ==
Kepler-174 has three confirmed super-Earth planets orbiting it, Kepler-174b, Kepler-174c and Kepler-174d, discovered by the Kepler space telescope using the transit method. The discovery of all three planets was announced in 2014 by a team led by Jason F. Rowe, as part of a study validating hundreds of Kepler planets. Kepler-174d is notable as it is within the star's habitable zone, meaning it is potentially habitable.

The Kepler-174 planetary system
| Companion (in order from star) | Mass | Semimajor axis (AU) | Orbital period (days) | Eccentricity | Inclination (°) | Radius |
|---|---|---|---|---|---|---|
| b | — | 0.100 | 13.981790±0.000024 | — | — | 1.96±0.11 R_{🜨} |
| c | — | 0.214 | 44.000529±0.000265 | — | — | 1.49±0.09 R_{🜨} |
| d | — | 0.677 | 247.353730±0.002001 | — | — | 2.19±0.13 R_{🜨} |

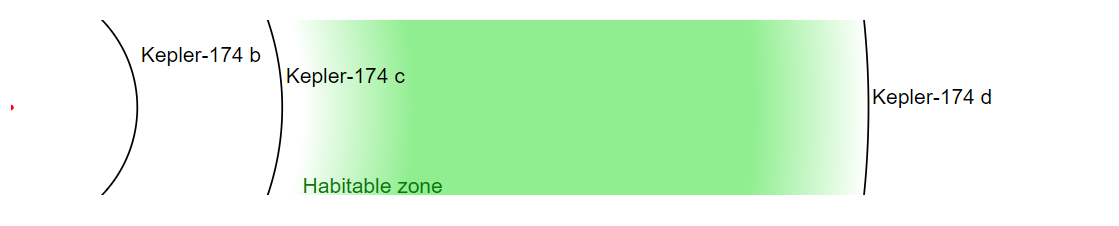
Kepler-174 habitable zone shown

== In popular culture ==
The planet Kepler-174d is mentioned in the Star Trek: Discovery episode, Terra Firma, Part 1. in which it is inhabited and is referred to as "quite beautiful".
