= Kepler-432 =

Binary star system in the constellation Cygnus

Observation data Epoch J2000 Equinox ICRS
- Constellation: Cygnus
- Right ascension: 19^{h} 33^{m} 07.7292^{s}
- Declination: +48° 17′ 09.145″
- Apparent magnitude (V): 12.5

Characteristics
- Evolutionary stage: red giant branch + main sequence
- Spectral type: K2III + M?V

Astrometry
Proper motion (μ)	RA: 4.667(12) mas/yr Dec.: 9.963(11) mas/yr
Parallax (π)	1.1712±0.0097 mas
Distance	2,780 ± 20 ly (854 ± 7 pc)

Position (relative to Kepler-432 A)
Component	Kepler-432 B
Projected separation	~750 AU

Orbit
Primary	Kepler-432 A
Secondary	Kepler-432 B
Period (P)	15,000 yr

Details

Kepler-432 A
Mass	1.32+0.10 −0.07 M_{☉}
Radius	4.06+0.12 −0.08 R_{☉}
Luminosity	9.206 ± 0.01 L_{☉}
Surface gravity (log g)	3.345 ± 0.006 cgs
Temperature	4995 ± 78 K
Metallicity [Fe/H]	0.176 ± 0.07 dex
Rotational velocity (v sin i)	2.7 ± 0.5 km/s
Age	4.2+0.8 −1.0 Gyr

Kepler-432 B
Mass	~0.52 M_{☉}
Temperature	~3660 K
Age	4.2? Gyr

Other designations
- KOI-1299, KIC 10864656, 2MASS J19330772+4817092, Gaia DR2 2128901871432519936

Database references
SIMBAD	data
KIC	data

Kepler-432 is a binary star system with at least two planets in orbit around the primary companion, located about 2,780 light-years away from Earth.

== Nomenclature and history ==
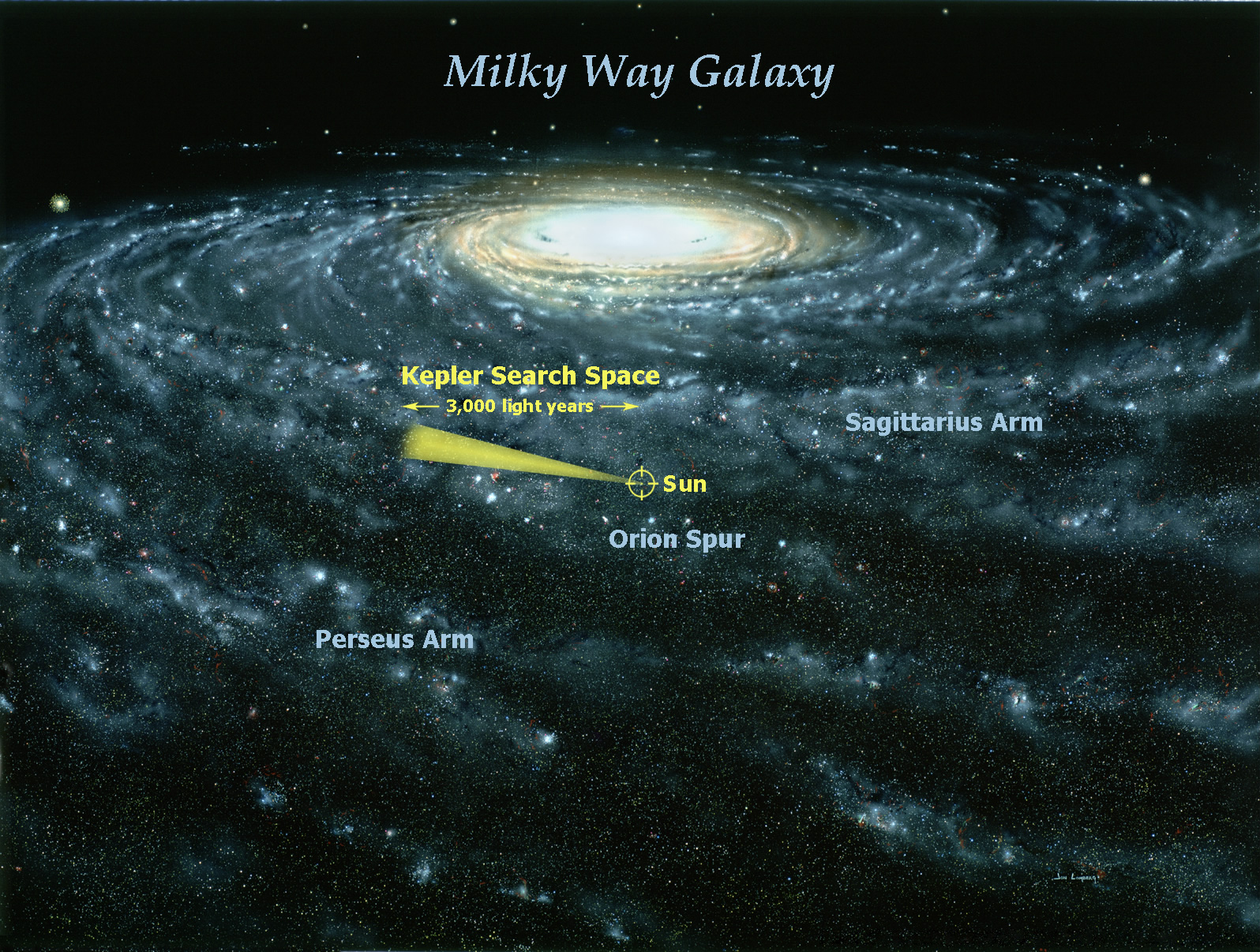
The Kepler Space Telescope search volume, in the context of the Milky Way Galaxy.

Prior to Kepler observation, Kepler-432 had the 2MASS catalogue number 2MASS J19330772+4817092. In the Kepler Input Catalog it has the designation of KIC 10864656, and when it was found to have transiting planet candidates it was given the Kepler object of interest number of KOI-1299.

Planetary candidates were detected around the star by NASA's Kepler Mission, a mission tasked with discovering planets in transit around their stars. The transit method that Kepler uses involves detecting dips in brightness in stars. These dips in brightness can be interpreted as planets whose orbits pass in front of their stars from the perspective of Earth, although other phenomenon can also be responsible which is why the term planetary candidate is used.

Following the acceptance of the discovery paper, the Kepler team provided an additional moniker for the system of "Kepler-432". The discoverers referred to the star as Kepler-432, which is the normal procedure for naming the exoplanets discovered by the spacecraft. Hence, this is the name used by the public to refer to the star and its planet.

Candidate planets that are associated with stars studied by the Kepler Mission are assigned the designations ".01", ".02" etc. after the star's name, in the order of discovery. If planet candidates are detected simultaneously, then the ordering follows the order of orbital periods from shortest to longest. Following these rules, there was two candidate planets detected, with orbital periods of 52.501129 and 406.2 days.

The designation b and c derive from the order of discovery. The designation of b is given to the first planet orbiting a given star, and c to the farthest. In the case of Kepler-432, there was initially two detected, so the letters b and c are used. The planets are more commonly referred to without the "A" designation, although sometimes the full designation is used.

== Stellar characteristics ==
Kepler-432 is a binary star system composed of a K-type giant star (Kepler-432 A) and a red dwarf star (Kepler-432 B).

The apparent magnitude of the system, or how bright it appears from Earth's perspective, is about 15.8. Therefore, it is too dim to be seen with the naked eye.

=== Kepler-432 A ===
Kepler-432 A is a K-type giant star. It has exhausted the hydrogen in its core and has begun expanding into a red giant. The star has a mass and radius 132% and 406% that of the Sun. It has a temperature of 4995 K and is 4.2 billion years old. In comparison, the Sun is about 4.6 billion years old and has a temperature of 5778 K.

The primary star is metal-rich, with a metallicity ([Fe/H]) of about 0.17, or about 147% of the amount of iron and other heavier metals found in the Sun. Its luminosity is typical for an evolving giant star like Kepler-432, with a luminosity about 9.3 times the solar luminosity.

The apparent magnitude of the system, or how bright it appears from Earth's perspective, is about 15.8. Therefore, it is too dim to be seen with the naked eye.

=== Kepler-432 B ===
Kepler-432 B is a red dwarf companion with an estimated mass 36% that of the Sun and an estimated temperature of 3660 K. The projected separation is estimated to be around 750 AU.

== Planetary system ==
The Kepler-432 A planetary system
Companion (in order from star)	Mass	Semimajor axis (AU)	Orbital period (days)	Eccentricity	Inclination (°)	Radius
b	5.41+0.32 −0.8 M_{J}	0.301 ± 0.014	52.501129	0.5134 ± 0.01	88.17+0.61 −0.33	1.45 ± 0.039 R_{J}
c	2.43+0.22 −0.24 M_{J}	1.1?	406.2+3.9 −2.5	—	—	—

The primary companion is known to host 2 giant planets, both more massive than Jupiter. The innermost planet, Kepler-432b, is interacting with its star and is slowly spiraling inwards towards its star as a result of tidal interaction. It will probably be devoured by its star as it expands past the orbit of planet b. The outermost planet was only detected through radial velocity and hence only its mass is known.
