= BD−11 4672 =

Orange dwarf in the constellation Scutum

BD−11°4672
Observation data Epoch J2000.0 Equinox ICRS
- Constellation: Scutum
- Right ascension: 18^{h} 33^{m} 28.832^{s}
- Declination: −11° 38′ 09.72″
- Apparent magnitude (V): 9.99±0.05

Characteristics
- Evolutionary stage: main sequence
- Spectral type: K7 V
- Apparent magnitude (B): 11.21±0.10
- Apparent magnitude (J): 7.651±0.023
- B−V color index: 1.263±0.009

Astrometry
| Radial velocity (R_{v}) | −87.515±0.0011 km/s |
| Proper motion (μ) | RA: −288.440 mas/yr Dec.: −235.615 mas/yr |
| Parallax (π) | 36.7534±0.0157 mas |
| Distance | 88.74 ± 0.04 ly (27.21 ± 0.01 pc) |

Details
| Mass | 0.651^{+0.031}_{−0.029} M_{☉} |
| Radius | 0.639^{+0.020}_{−0.022} R_{☉} |
| Luminosity | 0.157^{+0.019}_{−0.017} L_{☉} |
| Surface gravity (log g) | 4.642^{+0.027}_{−0.025} cgs |
| Temperature | 4,550±110 K |
| Metallicity [Fe/H] | −0.48±0.07 dex |
| Rotation | ~25 d |
| Rotational velocity (v sin i) | 1.0±0.5 km/s |
| Age | 7.4^{+4.5}_{−4.9} Gyr |

Other designations
- BD−11 4672, GJ 717, HIP 90979, PPM 234703, Wolf 1462, TYC 5699-2129-1, GSC 05699-02129, 2MASS J18332885-1138097, Gaia DR2 4154598526336121600

Database references
| SIMBAD | data |
| Exoplanet Archive | data |

BD−11 4672 is a single star with a pair of orbiting exoplanets in the southern constellation of Scutum, the shield. The designation BD−11 4672 comes from the Bonner Durchmusterung star catalogue, which was published during the nineteenth century in Germany. With an apparent visual magnitude of 9.99, the star is much too faint to be viewed with the naked eye. It is located at a distance of 89 light-years from the Sun, as determined from parallax, but is drifting closer with a radial velocity of −87.5 km/s. This was recognised as a high proper motion star by German astronomer Max Wolf in 1924 and is traversing the celestial sphere at an angular rate of 0.401 arcsec yr^{−1}.

The spectrum of BD−11 4672 matches a K-type main-sequence star, an orange dwarf, with a stellar classification of K7 V. Its age is not well constrained, but is probably older than the Sun. It is a metal-poor star, showing an iron abundance that is 35% of solar. No significant flare activity was detected. The star shows evidence of a Sun-like magnetic activity cycle with a period of 7–10 years. It has 65% of the mass and 64% of the radius of the Sun. The star is radiating 16% of the luminosity of the Sun from its photosphere at an effective temperature of 4,550 K.

== Planetary system ==
In 2010, a team of astronomers led by astronomer C. Moutou of the High Accuracy Radial Velocity Planet Searcher performed a radial-velocity analysis, which led to the suspicion of a gas giant exoplanet in orbit around BD−11 4672. The existence of this exoplanet was confirmed in 2014. In 2020, a second exoplanet was detected on an interior and much more eccentric orbit near the inner edge of the star's habitable zone.

The BD−11 4672 planetary system
| Companion (in order from star) | Mass | Semimajor axis (AU) | Orbital period (days) | Eccentricity | Inclination (°) | Radius |
|---|---|---|---|---|---|---|
| c | ≥15.37+2.97 −2.81 M_{🜨} | 0.30±0.01 | 74.20+0.06 −0.08 | 0.40+0.13 −0.15 | — | — |
| b | ≥0.65+0.05 −0.06 M_{J} | 2.36±0.04 | 1634+13 −14 | 0.05+0.05 −0.03 | — | — |

== See also ==
- List of exoplanets discovered in 2014 (BD-11 4672b)
- List of exoplanets discovered in 2020 (BD-11 4672c)
