= Kepler-107 =

Star in the constellation Cygnus

Observation data Epoch J2000 Equinox ICRS
- Constellation: Cygnus
- Right ascension: 19^{h} 48^{m} 06.77346^{s}
- Declination: +48° 12′ 30.964″
- Apparent magnitude (V): 12.70

Characteristics
- Evolutionary stage: subgiant
- Spectral type: F6/G1 IV/V
- Apparent magnitude (B): 13.34
- Apparent magnitude (V): 12.70
- Apparent magnitude (J): 11.39
- Apparent magnitude (K): 11.06

Astrometry
Radial velocity (R_{v})	5.64423±0.00045 km/s
Proper motion (μ)	RA: −9.393 mas/yr Dec.: 0.158 mas/yr
Parallax (π)	1.9259±0.0092 mas
Distance	1,694 ± 8 ly (519 ± 2 pc)

Details
Mass	1.238±0.029 M_{☉}
Radius	1.447±0.014 R_{☉}
Luminosity	2.38 L_{☉}
Surface gravity (log g)	Spectroscopic: 4.28±0.10 cgs Asteroseismic: 4.210±0.013 cgs
Temperature	5854±61 K
Metallicity [Fe/H]	0.321±0.065 dex
Rotation	22.35 days
Rotational velocity (v sin i)	3.6±0.5 km/s
Age	4.29+0.70 −0.56 Gyr

Other designations
- Kepler-107, KOI-117, KIC 10875245, 2MASS J19480677+4812309

Database references
SIMBAD	data
Exoplanet Archive	data

Kepler-107 is a star about 1,694 light-years (519 parsecs) away in the constellation Cygnus. No stellar companions were found as of 2016.

== Planetary system ==
Kepler-107 has four known planets discovered in 2014. A giant impact is the likely origin of two planets in the system. Kepler-107 c is more than twice as dense (about 12.6 g/cm^{3}) as the innermost exoplanet Kepler-107 b (about 5.3 g/cm^{3}).

The Kepler-107 planetary system
Companion (in order from star)	Mass	Semimajor axis (AU)	Orbital period (days)	Eccentricity	Inclination (°)	Radius
b	3.8+1.8 −1.7 M_{🜨}	0.04544±0.00036	3.1800218±0.0000029	<0.10	89.05±0.67	1.536±0.025 R_{🜨}
c	10.0±2.0 M_{🜨}	0.06064±0.00048	4.901452±0.0	<0.080	89.49+0.34 −0.44	1.597±0.026 R_{🜨}
d	<7.7 M_{🜨}	0.08377±0.00065	7.95839±0.00012	<0.11	87.55+0.64 −0.48	0.860±0.060 R_{🜨}
e	14.1±3.3 M_{🜨}	0.12638±0.00099	14.749143±0.000019	<0.10	89.67±0.22	2.903±0.035 R_{🜨}
