= Kepler-182 =

Star in the constellation Cygnus

Observation data Epoch J2000 Equinox J2000
- Constellation: Cygnus
- Right ascension: 19^{h} 19^{m} 19.239^{s}
- Declination: +50° 35′ 10.44″
- Apparent magnitude (V): 14.9

Characteristics
- Evolutionary stage: subgiant
- Spectral type: F3

Astrometry
Proper motion (μ)	RA: −7.566 mas/yr Dec.: −7.217 mas/yr
Parallax (π)	0.6117±0.0167 mas
Distance	5,300 ± 100 ly (1,630 ± 40 pc)

Details
Mass	1.07 M_{☉}
Radius	1.43 R_{☉}
Luminosity	2.21 L_{☉}
Surface gravity (log g)	4.16 cgs
Temperature	5,883 K
Metallicity [Fe/H]	0.07 dex
Rotation	44 days
Rotational velocity (v sin i)	3.6 km/s
Age	5.0 Gyr

Other designations
- KOI-546, KIC 12058931, 2MASS J19191922+5035104

Database references
SIMBAD	data
KIC	data

Kepler-182 is a star in the constellation of Cygnus. The star is notable for having two planets in the circumstellar habitable zone.

With a mass the same as the Sun's and an age of five billion years, Kepler-182 has exhausted its core hydrogen and expanded away from the main sequence. It is now a subgiant contracting towards the red giant branch. It has a radius of 1.4 R_{☉} and an effective temperature of 5,883 K, giving a bolometric luminosity of 2.2 L_{☉}.

Two exoplanets orbit it. The first, Kepler-182b, has a radius of 0.23 R_{J} and orbits the parent star every 9.8 days. The second, Kepler-182c, has a radius of 0.306 R_{J} and orbits the parent star every 20.7 days.

The Kepler-182 planetary system
Companion (in order from star)	Mass	Semimajor axis (AU)	Orbital period (days)	Eccentricity	Inclination	Radius
b	—	0.096	9.825792 ± 0.000062	—	—	0.23 ± 0.105 R_{J}
c	—	0.157	20.684342 ± 0.000097	—	—	0.306 ± 0.136 R_{J}
