= HD 176693 =

Star in the constellation Draco

Observation data Epoch J2000 Equinox ICRS
- Constellation: Draco
- Right ascension: 18^{h} 59^{m} 08.684^{s}
- Declination: 48° 25′ 23.60″
- Apparent magnitude (V): 8.83

Characteristics
- Evolutionary stage: Main sequence
- Spectral type: F8V
- B−V color index: 0.51

Astrometry
Radial velocity (R_{v})	−54.76±0.18 km/s
Proper motion (μ)	RA: 4.704±0.013 mas/yr Dec.: 9.263±0.016 mas/yr
Parallax (π)	11.2176±0.0126 mas
Distance	290.8 ± 0.3 ly (89.1 ± 0.1 pc)

Details
Mass	1.05±0.04 M_{☉}
Radius	1.253±0.051 R_{☉}
Luminosity	1.864 L_{☉}
Surface gravity (log g)	4.318^{+0.08}_{−0.089} cgs
Temperature	6,080±65 K
Metallicity [Fe/H]	−0.138^{+0.043}_{−0.042} dex
Rotation	12.89±0.19 d
Rotational velocity (v sin i)	2.8±1.0 km/s
Age	7.15±1.61 Gyr

Other designations
- BD+48 2806, HD 176693, Kepler-408, KOI-1612, KIC 10963065, TYC 3545-1227-1, GSC 03545-01227, 2MASS J18590868+4825236, Gaia EDR3 2131593785132997632

Database references
SIMBAD	data

HD 176693, also known as Kepler-408, is a star with a close orbiting exoplanet in the northern constellation of Draco. It is located at a distance of 291 light years from the Sun based on parallax measurements, but it is drifting closer with a radial velocity of −55 km/s. The star is predicted to come as close as 23.1 light-years in 1.6 million years. It has an apparent visual magnitude of 8.83, which is too faint to be viewed with the naked eye.

The spectrum of HD 176693 matches an F-type main-sequence star with a stellar classification of F8V. The star is older than the Sun, at 7.15 billion years. It is slightly and uniformly depleted in heavy elements compared to the Sun, having about 75% of the solar abundance of iron and other heavy elements. HD 176693 is a chromospherically inactive star, although there is weak evidence for tidal spin-up due to star-planet interaction.

HD 176693 is 5% more massive than the Sun and has a 25% larger radius. It is radiating 1.9 times the luminosity of the Sun from its photosphere at an effective temperature of 6,080 K. The star is spinning with a rotation period of 12.89 days. As of 2016, multiplicity surveys have not detect any stellar companions to HD 176693.

== Planetary system ==
In 2014, a transiting Sub-Earth planet b was detected on a tight 2.5 day orbit. Initially reported with a relatively low confidence of 97.9%, it was confirmed in 2016.

The planetary orbit is inclined to the equatorial plane of the star by 41.7^{+5.1}_{−3.5}°. Such strong spin-orbit misalignment is unique for a sub-Earth transiting planet, and needs either additional giant planets in the system or a history of close stellar encounters to explain it. The planet may also be a captured body originating from elsewhere.

The Kepler-408 planetary system
Companion (in order from star)	Mass	Semimajor axis (AU)	Orbital period (days)	Eccentricity	Inclination (°)	Radius
b	≥ 0.02 M_{J}	—	2.465024±0.000005	—	81.85±0.10	0.86±0.04 R_{🜨}
