= CD−44 170 =

Star in the constellation Phoenix

CD−44°170
Observation data Epoch J2000 Equinox ICRS
- Constellation: Phoenix
- Right ascension: 00^{h} 39^{m} 58.8236^{s}
- Declination: −44° 15′ 11.577″
- Apparent magnitude (V): 11.401

Characteristics
- Evolutionary stage: main sequence
- Spectral type: M0.5V

Astrometry
Radial velocity (R_{v})	11.85±0.19 km/s
Proper motion (μ)	RA: 483.002 mas/yr Dec.: −221.111 mas/yr
Parallax (π)	42.3320±0.0248 mas
Distance	77.05 ± 0.05 ly (23.62 ± 0.01 pc)
Absolute magnitude (M_{V})	+9.51

Details
Mass	0.53 M_{☉}
Radius	0.52 R_{☉}
Luminosity	0.04597±0.00087 L_{☉}
Surface gravity (log g)	4.73 cgs
Temperature	3604±72 K
Metallicity [Fe/H]	−0.09±0.09 dex
Rotation	31.8 d
Rotational velocity (v sin i)	2.00 km/s
Age	8.27±4.08 Gyr

Other designations
- GJ 27.1, HIP 3143, TYC 7531-1014-1, 2MASS J00395880-4415117, Gaia DR2 4980466929964496128

Database references
SIMBAD	data

CD−44 170, also known as Gliese 27.1, Gliese 9018 and HIP 3143, is an M-type main-sequence star. Its surface temperature is 3,604 K (6,028 °F; 3,331 °C)±72 K. The star's concentration of heavy elements is similar to that of the Sun.

== Planetary system ==
In 2014, a planet named Gliese 27.1 b with an orbital period of 16 days was announced. It was discovered using the radial velocity method. The planetary equilibrium temperature is 406 K (271 °F; 133 °C). The planet's existence was doubted until 2020 because the putative orbital period is equal to half of the star's rotational period.

The Gliese 27.1 planetary system
Companion (in order from star)	Mass	Semimajor axis (AU)	Orbital period (days)	Eccentricity	Inclination (°)	Radius
b (disputed)	> 13^{+4.1}_{−6.6} M_{🜨}	0.101^{+0.009}_{−0.013}	15.8190^{+0.0049}_{−0.0026}	—	—	>3.63 R_{🜨}
