= Kepler-223 =

G5V star in the constellation Cygnus

Observation data Epoch J2000.0 Equinox J2000.0
- Constellation: Cygnus
- Right ascension: 19^{h} 53^{m} 16.4202^{s}
- Declination: +47° 16′ 46.308″
- Apparent magnitude (V): 15.3

Characteristics
- Evolutionary stage: subgiant
- Spectral type: G8
- Apparent magnitude (g): 15.903
- Apparent magnitude (r): 15.301
- Apparent magnitude (i): 15.105
- Apparent magnitude (z): 14.963
- Apparent magnitude (D51): 15.667
- Apparent magnitude (J): 14.095
- Apparent magnitude (H): 13.727
- Apparent magnitude (K): 13.632
- J−K color index: 0.463

Astrometry
Proper motion (μ)	RA: −4.227(25) mas/yr Dec.: −11.094(24) mas/yr
Parallax (π)	0.5005±0.0215 mas
Distance	6,500 ± 300 ly (2,000 ± 90 pc)

Details
Mass	1.04 M_{☉}
Radius	1.52 R_{☉}
Surface gravity (log g)	4.09 cgs
Temperature	5,803 K
Metallicity [Fe/H]	−0.211 dex
Rotation	17.82 days
Rotational velocity (v sin i)	2.4 km/s
Age	3.7 Gyr

Other designations
- KOI-730, KIC 10227020, 2MASS J195316.40+471646.1

Database references
SIMBAD	data
Exoplanet Archive	data
KIC	data

Kepler-223 (KOI-730, KIC 10227020) is a G8 star with an extrasolar planetary system discovered by the Kepler mission. Studies indicate that the Kepler-223 star system consists of 4 planets orbiting the star.

== Planetary system ==
The Kepler-223 planetary system
Companion (in order from star)	Mass	Semimajor axis (AU)	Orbital period (days)	Eccentricity	Inclination	Radius
b	—	—	7.3845	—	—	3 R_{🜨}
c	—	—	9.8456	—	—	3.4 R_{🜨}
d	—	—	14.7887	—	—	5.2 R_{🜨}
e	—	—	19.7257	—	—	4.6 R_{🜨}

The confirmed planetary system was first detected by the Kepler mission, and contains four planets. This system was initially believed to contain two co-orbital planets orbiting the star at approximately the same orbital distance every 9.8 days, with one permanently locked 60° behind the other in one of the two Trojan Lagrangian points. The two co-orbital planets were thought to be locked in mean motion resonances with the other two planets, creating an overall 6:4:4:3 resonance. This would have been the first known example of co-orbital planets.

However, follow-up study of the system revealed that an alternative configuration, with the four planets having orbital periods in the ratio 8:6:4:3 is better supported by the data. This configuration does not contain co-orbital planets, and has been confirmed by further observations. It represents the first confirmed 4-body orbital resonance.

The radii are 3.0, 3.4, 5.2, and 4.6 Earth radii, and the orbital periods are 7.3845, 9.8456, 14.7887 and 19.7257 days, respectively.

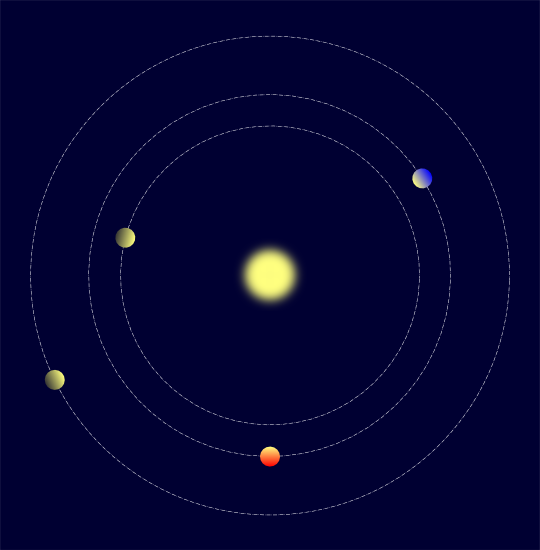
Kepler-223 6:4:4:3 orbital ratios

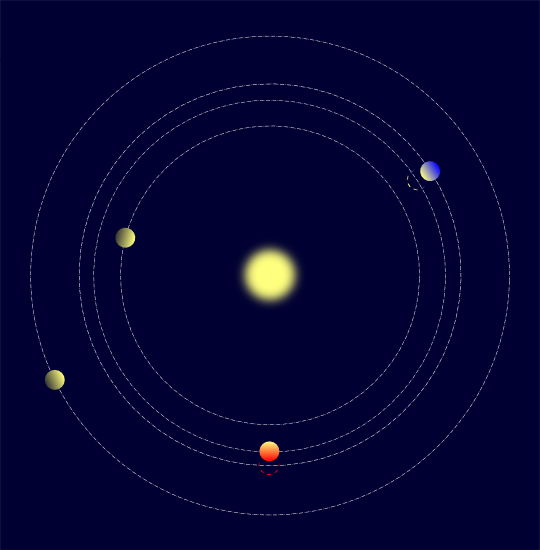
Kepler-223 8:6:4:3 orbital ratios
