= Kepler-421b =

Extrasolar planet

Discovery
- Discovery site: Kepler telescope
- Discovery date: 2014
- Detection method: Transit

Orbital characteristics
- Semi-major axis: 1.219 AU (182,400,000 km)
- Orbital period (sidereal): 704.1984 d
- Inclination: 89.965
- Star: Kepler-421

Physical characteristics
- Mean radius: 4.16 R_{🜨}
- Mass: 16.1 M_{🜨}

Kepler-421b is an exoplanet that, as of July 2014, has the longest known year of any transiting planet (704 days), although not as long as the planets that have been directly imaged, or many of the planets found by the radial-velocity method, or as long as some transiting planet candidates which are listed as planets in the Extrasolar Planets Encyclopaedia (KIC 5010054 b etc.). It is the first transiting-planet found near the snow-line.

Normally, at least three transits are required to confirm a planet. Due to very high signal to noise ratio, only two transits were sufficient to validate Kepler-421b to be a real planet without additional confirmation methods.

Kepler-421b is slightly larger than Uranus, and having a mass 16.1 times that of Earth, typical of an ice giant.
