= GJ 3293 =

Star in the constellation Eridanus

Observation data Epoch J2000 Equinox ICRS
- Constellation: Eridanus
- Right ascension: 04^{h} 28^{m} 35.71911^{s}
- Declination: −25° 10′ 09.2979″
- Apparent magnitude (V): 11.96

Characteristics
- Evolutionary stage: main sequence
- Spectral type: M2.5

Astrometry
Radial velocity (R_{v})	+13.116±0.0024 km/s
Proper motion (μ)	RA: −81.375 mas/yr Dec.: −485.454 mas/yr
Parallax (π)	49.4868±0.0227 mas
Distance	65.91 ± 0.03 ly (20.207 ± 0.009 pc)
Absolute magnitude (M_{V})	10.66

Details
Mass	0.420 M_{☉}
Radius	0.40±0.03 R_{☉}
Luminosity	0.022 L_{☉}
Temperature	3,466±49 K
Metallicity [Fe/H]	0.02±0.09 dex
Rotational velocity (v sin i)	−25.9±6.6 km/s

Other designations
- GJ 3293, LHS 1672, 2MASS J04283571-2510088, Gaia DR2 4893118771316702720

Database references
SIMBAD	data
Exoplanet Archive	data
ARICNS	data

GJ 3293 (sometimes Gliese 3293) is a star in the constellation of Eridanus, that is orbited by four planets, two of which (GJ 3293b & GJ 3293d) are located within the star's habitable zone. It is located at the celestial coordinates: Right Ascension 04^{h} 28^{m} 35.71911^{s}, Declination −25° 10′ 09.2979″. With an apparent visual magnitude of 11.96, this star is too faint to be seen with the naked eye. It can be viewed with a telescope having an aperture of at least 4 in (10 cm). The estimated distance to GJ 3293 is 65.9 light-years (20.2 parsecs), based on its stellar parallax. GJ 3293 is significantly smaller and cooler than the Sun.

== Planetary system ==
In 2015, it was discovered that GJ 3293 possessed two planets, and in 2017 an additional two planets were discovered, making a total of four. Two of these planets are located within the habitable zone: GJ 3293b and GJ 3293d.

The GJ 3293 planetary system
Companion (in order from star)	Mass	Semimajor axis (AU)	Orbital period (days)	Eccentricity	Inclination (°)	Radius
e	≥3.28±0.64 M_{🜨}	0.08208+0.00003 −0.00004	13.2543+0.0078 −0.0104	0.21+0.20 −0.14	—	—
b	≥23.54+0.88 −0.89 M_{🜨}	0.14339±0.00003	30.5987+0.0083 −0.0084	0.06±0.04	—	—
d	≥7.60±1.05 M_{🜨}	0.19394+0.00017 −0.00018	48.1345+0.0628 −0.0661	0.12+0.13 −0.09	—	—
c	≥21.09+1.24 −1.26 M_{🜨}	0.36175+0.00048 −0.00047	122.6196+0.2429 −0.2371	0.11+0.10 −0.08	—	—
