= Kepler-432b =

Hot Jupiter in the constellation of Cygnus

Discovery
- Discovered by: Kepler spacecraft
- Discovery date: 24 January 2015
- Detection method: Transit method

Orbital characteristics
- Semi-major axis: 0.301 (± 0.014) AU
- Eccentricity: 0.5134 (± 0.01)
- Orbital period (sidereal): 52.501+0.00007 −0.00005 d
- Inclination: 88.17+0.61 −0.33
- Star: Kepler-432 A (KOI-1299)

Physical characteristics
- Mean radius: 1.45 (± 0.039) R_{J}
- Mass: 5.41+0.32 −0.8 M_{J}
- Mean density: 4.46+0.37 −0.29 g cm^{−3}
- Temperature: 809 K (536 °C; 997 °F)

Kepler-432b (also known by its Kepler Object of Interest designation KOI-1299.01) is a hot super-Jupiter (or "warm" super-Jupiter) exoplanet orbiting the giant star Kepler-432 A, the innermost of two such planets discovered by NASA's Kepler spacecraft. It is located about 2,830 light-years (870 parsecs, or nearly 2.684×10^{16} km) from Earth in the constellation Cygnus. The exoplanet was found by using the transit method in which the dimming effect that a planet causes as it crosses in front of its star is measured.

== Characteristics ==
=== Mass, radius and temperature ===
Kepler-432b is a hot super-Jupiter, an exoplanet that has a radius and mass larger than that of the planet Jupiter, and with an extremely high temperature. It has a temperature of 809 K (536 °C; 997 °F). It has a mass of 5.41 M_{J} and a radius of 1.45 R_{J}. It also has a relatively high density for such a planet, at 4.46 g cm^{3}.

=== Host star ===
The planet orbits a (K-type) giant star named Kepler-432 A. It has exhausted the hydrogen in its core and has begun expanding into a red giant. The star has a mass of 1.32 M_{☉} and a radius of 4.06 R_{☉}. It has a surface temperatures of 4995 K and is 4.2 billion years old. In comparison, the Sun is about 4.6 billion years old and has a surface temperature of 5778 K.

The star's apparent magnitude, or how bright it appears from Earth's perspective, is 13. It is not bright enough to be seen with a naked eye.

=== Orbit ===
Kepler-432b orbits its host star with 920% of the Sun's luminosity (9.2 L_{☉}) about every 52 days at a distance of 0.30 AU (close to the orbital distance of Mercury from the Sun, which is 0.38 AU). It has an eccentric orbit, with an eccentricity of 0.5134.

== Stellar interactions and remaining lifetime ==
Observations made on Kepler-432b reveal that its host star is gradually causing the planet's orbit to decay via tidal interactions. As Kepler-432 A is ascending the red giant branch (RGB), it will continue to expand past the orbit of Kepler-432b, likely engulfing it completely. The drag between the stellar photosphere and the gas giant would cause its orbit to spiral inward until it is vaporized by the star after ablation and vaporization take its toll on the planet.

In some way, this helps with studying how similar interactions will eventually cause the Earth to be engulfed by the Sun as a red giant, some 7 billion years from now.

== Discovery ==
In 2009, NASA's Kepler spacecraft was completing observing stars on its photometer, the instrument it uses to detect transit events, in which a planet crosses in front of and dims its host star for a brief and roughly regular period of time. In this last test, Kepler observed 50000 stars in the Kepler Input Catalog, including Kepler-419, the preliminary light curves were sent to the Kepler science team for analysis, who chose obvious planetary companions from the bunch for follow-up at observatories. Observations for the potential exoplanet candidates took place between 13 May 2009 and 17 March 2012. After observing the respective transits, which for Kepler-432b occurred every 50 days, it was eventually concluded that a planetary companion was responsible for the periodic 50-day transits. The discovery of the oddball planet was announced on 24 January 2015.

== See also ==
- Kepler-1520 b – a similar planet about to be engulfed by its host star.
