= Kepler-419b =

Hot Jupiter orbiting Kepler-419

Discovery
- Discovered by: Kepler spacecraft
- Discovery date: 2012 (dubious); 12 June 2014 (confirmed)
- Detection method: Transit method

Orbital characteristics
- Semi-major axis: 0.37 (± 0.007) AU
- Eccentricity: 0.833 (± 0.013)
- Orbital period (sidereal): 69.7546 (± 0.0007) d
- Inclination: 88.95+0.14 −0.17
- Star: Kepler-419 (KOI-1474)

Physical characteristics
- Mean radius: 0.96 (± 0.12) R_{J}
- Mass: 2.5 (± 0.3) M_{J}
- Temperature: 505 K (232 °C; 449 °F)

Kepler-419b (also known by its Kepler Object of Interest designation KOI-1474.01) is a hot Jupiter exoplanet orbiting the star Kepler-419, the outermost of two such planets discovered by NASA's Kepler spacecraft. It is located about 3,400 light-years (1040 parsecs from Earth in the constellation Cygnus.

== Characteristics ==
=== Mass, radius and temperature ===
Kepler-419b is a hot Jupiter, an exoplanet that has a radius and mass near that of the planet Jupiter, but with a much higher temperature. It has a temperature of 505 K (232 °C; 449 °F). It has a mass of 2.5 M_{J} and a radius of 0.96 R_{J}.

=== Host star ===
The planet orbits an (F-type) star named Kepler-419. The star has a mass of 1.39 M_{☉} and a radius 1.75 R_{☉}. It has a surface temperatures of 6430 K and is 2.8 billion years old. In comparison, the Sun is about 4.6 billion years old and has a surface temperature of 5778 K.

The star's apparent magnitude, or how bright it appears from Earth's perspective, is 13. It is too dim to be seen with the naked eye.

=== Orbit ===
Kepler-419b orbits its host star with 270% of the Sun's luminosity (2.7 L_{☉}) about every 67 days at a distance of 0.37 AU (close to the orbital distance of Mercury from the Sun, which is 0.38 AU). It has a highly eccentric orbit, with an eccentricity of 0.833.

== Discovery ==
In 2009, NASA's Kepler spacecraft was completing observing stars on its photometer, the instrument it uses to detect transit events, in which a planet crosses in front of and dims its host star for a brief and roughly regular period of time. In this last test, Kepler observed 50000 stars in the Kepler Input Catalog, including Kepler-419, the preliminary light curves were sent to the Kepler science team for analysis, who chose obvious planetary companions from the bunch for follow-up at observatories. Observations for the potential exoplanet candidates took place between 13 May 2009 and 17 March 2012. After observing the respective transits, the first planet, Kepler-419b, was announced.
