= Kepler-371c =

Super Earth

Discovery
- Discovery site: Kepler Space Observatory
- Discovery date: 2014
- Detection method: Transit

Orbital characteristics
- Semi-major axis: 0.313 AU (46,800,000 km)
- Eccentricity: 0
- Orbital period (sidereal): 67.968015±0.001070 d
- Inclination: 89.95
- Star: Kepler-371

Physical characteristics
- Mean radius: 1.78 R_{🜨}

Kepler-371c (also known as KOI-2194.02, K02194.02, KIC 3548044 c) is a confirmed Super-Earth sized exoplanet. Orbiting around the F-type star Kepler-371 every 68 days about 1914 ly away from the Earth. It is a member of the multi planetary system of Kepler-371.
