= Kepler-371b =

Super Earth

Discovery
- Discovery site: Kepler Space Observatory
- Discovery date: 2014
- Detection method: Transit

Orbital characteristics
- Semi-major axis: 0.200 AU (29,900,000 km)
- Eccentricity: 0
- Orbital period (sidereal): 34.763278±0.000351 d
- Inclination: 89.04
- Star: Kepler-371

Physical characteristics
- Mean radius: 1.89 R_{🜨}

Kepler-371b (also known as KOI-2194.01, K02194.01, KIC 3548044 b) is a confirmed Super-Earth sized exoplanet, orbiting around the G-type star Kepler-371 every 35 days about 2,700 light-years away from Earth.
