= Kepler Input Catalog =

Star catalog

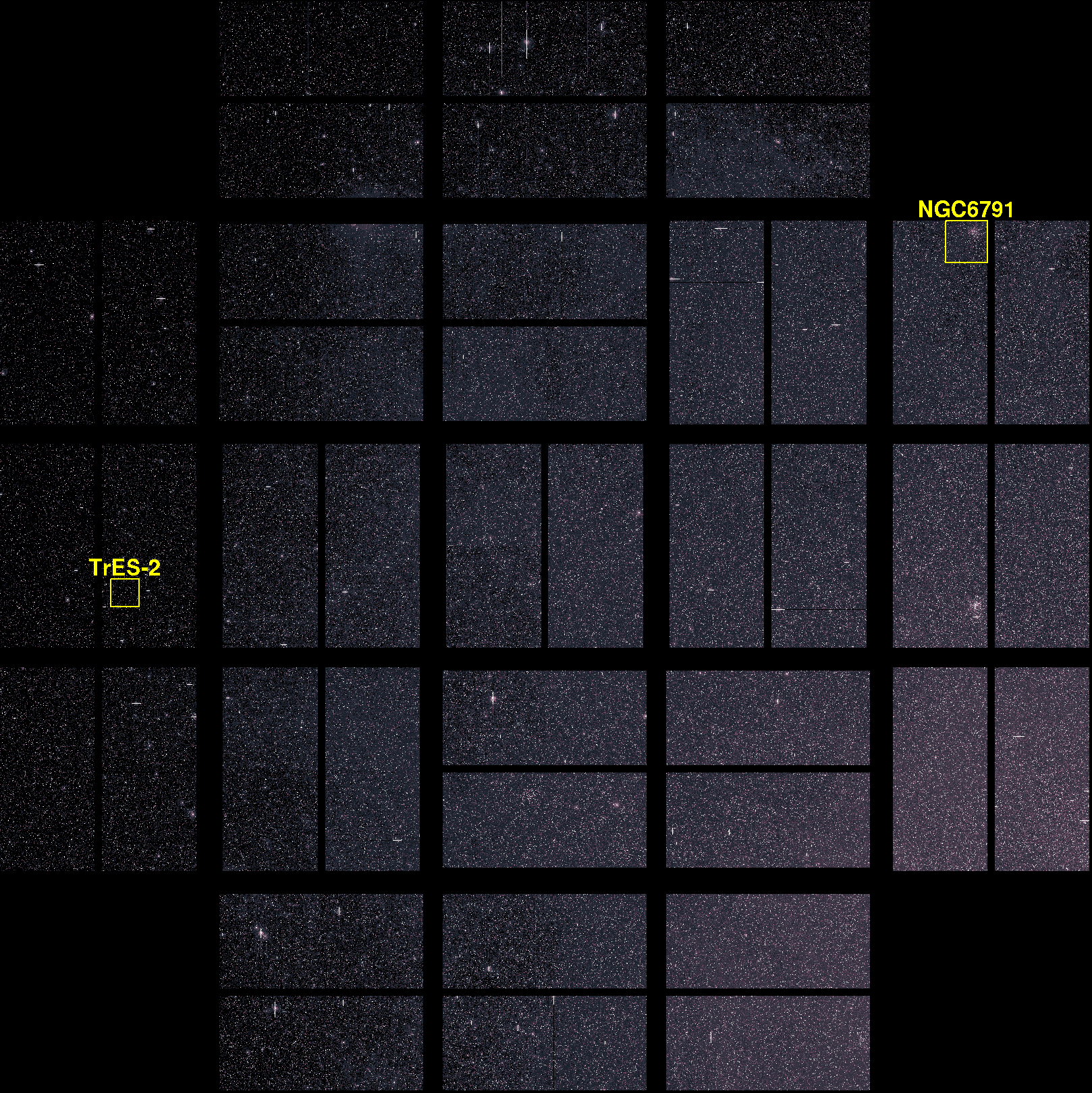
This image from NASA's Kepler mission shows the telescope's full field of view -- an expansive star-rich patch of sky in the constellations Cygnus, Lyra and Draco stretching across 100 square degrees, or the equivalent of two side-by-side dips of the Big Dipper. A cluster of stars, called NGC 6791, and a star with a known planet, called TrES-2b, are outlined. The cluster is eight billion years old, and located 13,000 light-years from Earth. It is called an open cluster because its stars are loosely bound and have started to spread out. TrES-2b is a hot Jupiter-like planet known to cross in front of, or transit, its star every 2.5 days. Kepler will hunt for transiting planets that are as small as Earth. Celestial north is towards the lower left corner.

The Kepler Input Catalog (or KIC) is a publicly searchable database of roughly 13.2 million targets used for the Kepler Spectral Classification Program (SCP) and the Kepler space telescope.

== Overview ==
The Kepler SCP targets were observed by the 2MASS project as well as Sloan filters, such as the griz filters. The catalog alone is not used for finding Kepler targets, because only a portion (about 1/3 of the catalog) can be observed by the spacecraft. The full catalog includes up to 21 magnitude, giving 13.2 million targets, but of these only about 6.5 to 4.5 million fall on Kepler's sensors.

KIC is one of the few comprehensive star catalogs for a spacecraft's field of view. The KIC was created because no catalog of sufficient depth and information existed for target selection at that time. The catalog includes "mass, radius, effective temperature, log (g), metallicity, and reddening extinction".

An example of a KIC catalog entry is KIC #10227020. Having had transit signals detected for this star, it has become a Kepler Object of Interest, with the designation KOI-730. The planets around the star are confirmed, so the star has the Kepler catalog designation Kepler-223.

Not all star Kepler Input Catalog stars with confirmed planets get a Kepler Object of Interest designation. The reason is that sometimes transit signals are detected by observations that were not made by the Kepler team. An example of one of these objects is Kepler-78b.

== Notable objects ==
KIC 8462852 is a binary star whose primary shows a mysterious transit profile. The origin of this profile is uncertain, with proposed explanations ranging from an uneven dust ring to a Dyson swarm or similar alien megastructure.

KIC 9832227 is a contact binary and an eclipsing binary with a period of about 11 hours.

KIC 11026764 is a G-type subgiant star whose asteroseismology has been studied extensively by Kepler. It shows weak variability with a period of about 1100 seconds.

KIC 9246715 is an eclipsing binary system consisting of two red giants. The primary component of the system has a radius of 8.37+0.03
−0.07 R_{☉} a mass of 2.171+0.006
−0.008 M_{☉}, and a temperature of 4930+140
−230 K, while the secondary component has a radius of 8.3+0.04
−0.03 R_{☉}, a mass of 2.149+0.006
−0.008 M_{☉} and the same temperature. Both stars orbit each other at a distance of 294,000,000 km (1.97 astronomical units), completing one orbit every 171 days.

KIC 11145123 is one of the more interesting non-KOI objects in the list. An A-type main-sequence star with unusually slow rotation for its high mass, it is currently believed to be the roundest natural object.

== See also ==
- Kepler object of interest (KOI)
- Hubble Guide Star Catalog
- Tabby's Star
