= Kepler-14b =

Extrasolar planet of the binary Kepler-14 system

Discovery
- Discovered by: L. Buchhave et al.
- Discovery site: Kepler spacecraft
- Discovery date: Paper submitted 27 June 2011
- Detection method: Transit method

Orbital characteristics
- Eccentricity: 0.035 (± 0.02)
- Orbital period (sidereal): 6.7901236131±0.0000003985 d
- Inclination: 90.0 ^{+0.0}_{−2.8}
- Star: Kepler-14A (KOI-98)

Physical characteristics
- Mean radius: 1.136 ^{+0.073}_{−0.054} R_{J}
- Mass: 8.40 ^{+0.19}_{−0.18} M_{J}
- Mean density: 7.1 (± 1.1) g cm^{−3}

Kepler-14b is an extrasolar planet in orbit around the primary star of the binary Kepler-14 system. It is currently the only planet known to exist in this star system. Kepler-14b is 8.4 times the mass of Jupiter and has a radius 1.14 times that of Jupiter, and it orbits its host star every 6.79 days. It was discovered by NASA-led Kepler mission, which noted the planet as a planetary candidate as early as March 2009, around the same time as the discovery of the first five planets discovered by Kepler (Kepler-4b to Kepler-8b). However, the team was unable to confirm the planet until extensive follow-up observations, as high-resolution imaging resolved the star Kepler-14 as a closely orbiting binary system. The Kepler team would have not noticed that Kepler-14 was a binary star based solely on initial radial velocity measurements (a standard method for confirming a planet's existence), and found that if they had not realized this, their data on Kepler-14b would have been very inaccurate.

== Discovery ==
NASA's Kepler spacecraft, which was launched in March 2009, collected photometric data continuously over a four-month period in a small area of sky, using a 0.95m Schmidt telescope. When the data collected during this period was analyzed, 1235 planetary candidates were identified amongst the observed 150,000 stars; all of these planetary candidates were suspected of transiting their host stars, in which the planetary body periodically crosses in front of and slightly dims its host star. Because the data collected on the transits of KOI-98 (later known as Kepler-14b) seemed very clearly to indicate a planet, Kepler identified KOI-98 early on in its mission. Data on the object of interest was forwarded to the Kepler Follow-up Program for a follow-up investigation.

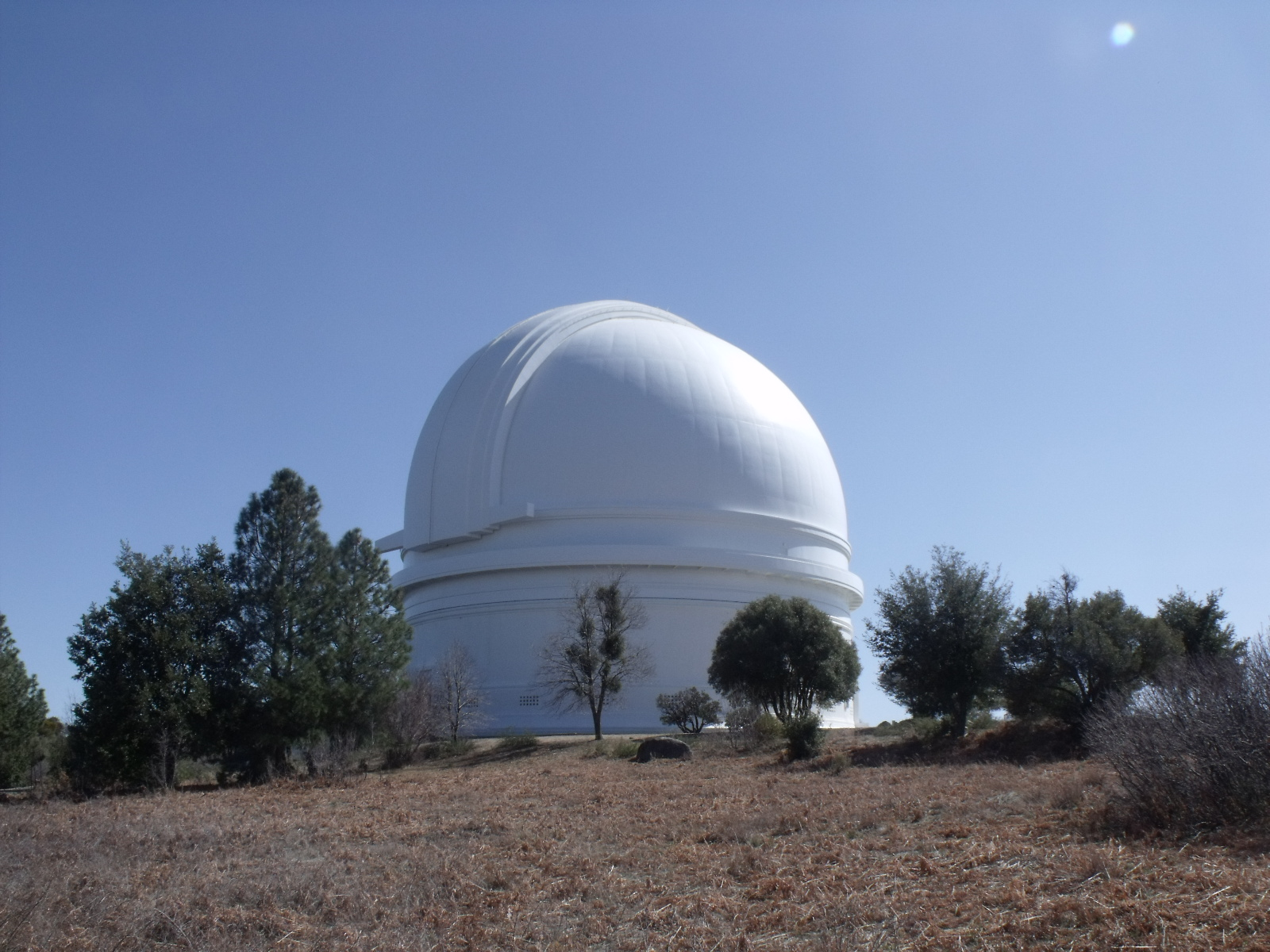
The Palomar Observatory confirmed findings suggesting that Kepler-14 was a binary star.

The Fibre-fed Échelle Spectrograph (FIES) on the Canary Islands' Nordic Optical Telescope was operated in October 2009, using Doppler spectroscopy to gather information that would accompany the gathered photometric observations. The High Resolution Échelle Spectrometer (HIRES) at the W.M. Keck Observatory was also utilized. Use of the WIYN Observatory for speckle imaging found that the host star of KOI-98 was actually a close-knit binary star, which complicated the analysis. A November 2009 operation of the ARIES instrument on the MMT Observatory and the July 2010 use of the PHARO near-infrared camera on the Palomar Observatory's 200 inch Hale Telescope used adaptive optics to confirm WIYN's findings. Although suspected as a planet early on, KOI-98 was not included when Kepler-4b, Kepler-5b, Kepler-6b, Kepler-7b, and Kepler-8b were published, as further investigation was still required.

Scientists investigated the possibility that the transit signal detected by Kepler was actually due to a third star in the system that eclipsed its sister stars. However a bisector analysis of the spectra of KOI-98's star ruled out that hypothesis.

On August 7, 2010, the Infrared Array Camera aboard the Spitzer Space Telescope was used to find the centroid, the point in space around which both of the Kepler-14 stars orbit. Analysis of the collected data determined which component of the binary star system was the site of the transit signal, and, additionally, that the transit signal came from the primary star in the system (as opposed to the fainter, less prominent star).

Using the spectral data collected by HIRES and FIES, the Kepler team derived the characteristics of the host star. The HIRES and FIES results agreed on every aspect of the star that had been derived except for the star's radial velocity. With the stellar parameters known, the Kepler team interpreted the Spitzer data to confirm that Kepler-14b was indeed a planet.

== Host star system ==
Kepler-14 is a binary star system, which means that it is actually composed of two gravitationally bound stars that orbit a common point in space. The system is composed of a primary star, Kepler-14A, and a dimmer companion star, Kepler-14B. When the stars were observed, while searching for the planet Kepler-14b, the angular separation of the binary system made it extremely difficult to note the dimmer companion star. The stars have such a wide orbit that it takes approximately 2800 years for each star to complete a revolution around the centroid. The two stars are located approximately 980 parsecs (3,196 light years) from Earth.

Kepler-14b's host star is the primary (A) component of the Kepler-14 binary system. However, because the binary system is so closely knit, it was impossible at the time of Kepler-14b's discovery to distinguish the characteristics of each individual star. If the Kepler-14 system was an individual star, it would be an F-type star. With an apparent magnitude of 12.12, the star system is not visible from Earth with the naked eye. Kepler-14's combined results resemble that of a star that is 1.512 solar masses and 2.048 solar radii. Its gyrochronological age, or its age as determined by the rate at which a star spins, is estimated at 2.2 billion years, far younger than the Sun. It is also hotter, with an effective temperature of 6395 K. With a metallicity of 0.12, Kepler-14 has 132% more iron than the amount measured in the Sun.

== Characteristics ==
Kepler-14b is the sole planet discovered in the Kepler-14 system to date. The planet orbits the primary star in the Kepler-14 binary system. Kepler-14b is estimated to have 8.40 Jupiter masses and 1.136 Jupiter radii. In other words, the planet is 8.4 times more massive than Jupiter, but only 1.136 times Jupiter's size. This equates to a high density, which is measured at 7.1 g cm^{−3}. According to the Extrasolar Planets Encyclopaedia, which calculated Kepler-14b's eccentricity independently, Kepler-14b has a slightly irregular orbit, with an orbital eccentricity of 0.035. Kepler-14b takes approximately 6.79 days to orbit its host star. The mean distance from its host star is about 8.213 times the measured radius of Kepler-14.

The authors of Kepler-14b's discovery paper noted that, had they not discovered that Kepler-14 was indeed a binary system, the parameters for Kepler-14b would have been extremely inaccurate. They noted that other planets discovered using radial velocity measurements might not have accounted for the possibility that their host stars were binary systems; the only way that this was definitely known in the case of Kepler-14 was through the use of high-resolution imaging. If the less prominent portion of the Kepler-14 binary system had not been detected, Kepler-14b's mass would have been incorrect by nearly 60%, and its radius too small by about 10%.
