= Kepler-14 =

Binary star system

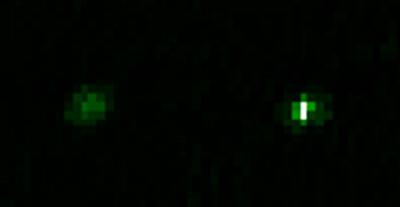
- A false-color image of the Kepler-14 binary system. Credit: NOIRLab

Observation data Epoch J2000 Equinox J2000
- Constellation: Lyra
- Right ascension: 19^{h} 10^{m} 50.110^{s}
- Declination: +47° 19′ 58.87″
- Apparent magnitude (V): 12.00

Characteristics
- Spectral type: F

Astrometry
Proper motion (μ)	RA: 1.0 mas/yr Dec.: -10.2 mas/yr
Distance	3200 ly (980 pc)

Orbit
Primary	Kepler-14A
Companion	Kepler-14B
Period (P)	~2800 yr
Semi-major axis (a)	280 AU

Details
Mass	1.512 (± 0.043) M_{☉}
Radius	2.048 ^{+0.112}_{−0.084} R_{☉}
Luminosity	6.29 ^{+0.75}_{−0.58} L_{☉}
Temperature	6395 (± 60) K
Metallicity	+0.12 (± 0.06)
Rotational velocity (v sin i)	7.9 (± 1.0) km/s
Age	2.2 ^{+0.2}_{−0.1} Gyr

Other designations
- KOI-98, KIC 10264660, TYC 3546-413-1, GSC 03546-00413, WDS J19108+4720AB, 2MASS J19105011+4719589

Database references
SIMBAD	data
KIC	data

Kepler-14 is a binary star system targeted by the Kepler spacecraft. It is host to one known planet: the Jupiter-like Kepler-14b. The star system was identified by Kepler as a possible planetary host, but when imaging revealed that Kepler-14 was a binary star system and not a single star, the confirmation process became protracted. The stars are separated by at least 280 AU, and the stars complete an orbit around a common center of mass every 2800 years. Both stars are larger than the Sun. They are of similar absolute magnitudes; however, the primary star is brighter as seen from Earth.

== Observational history ==
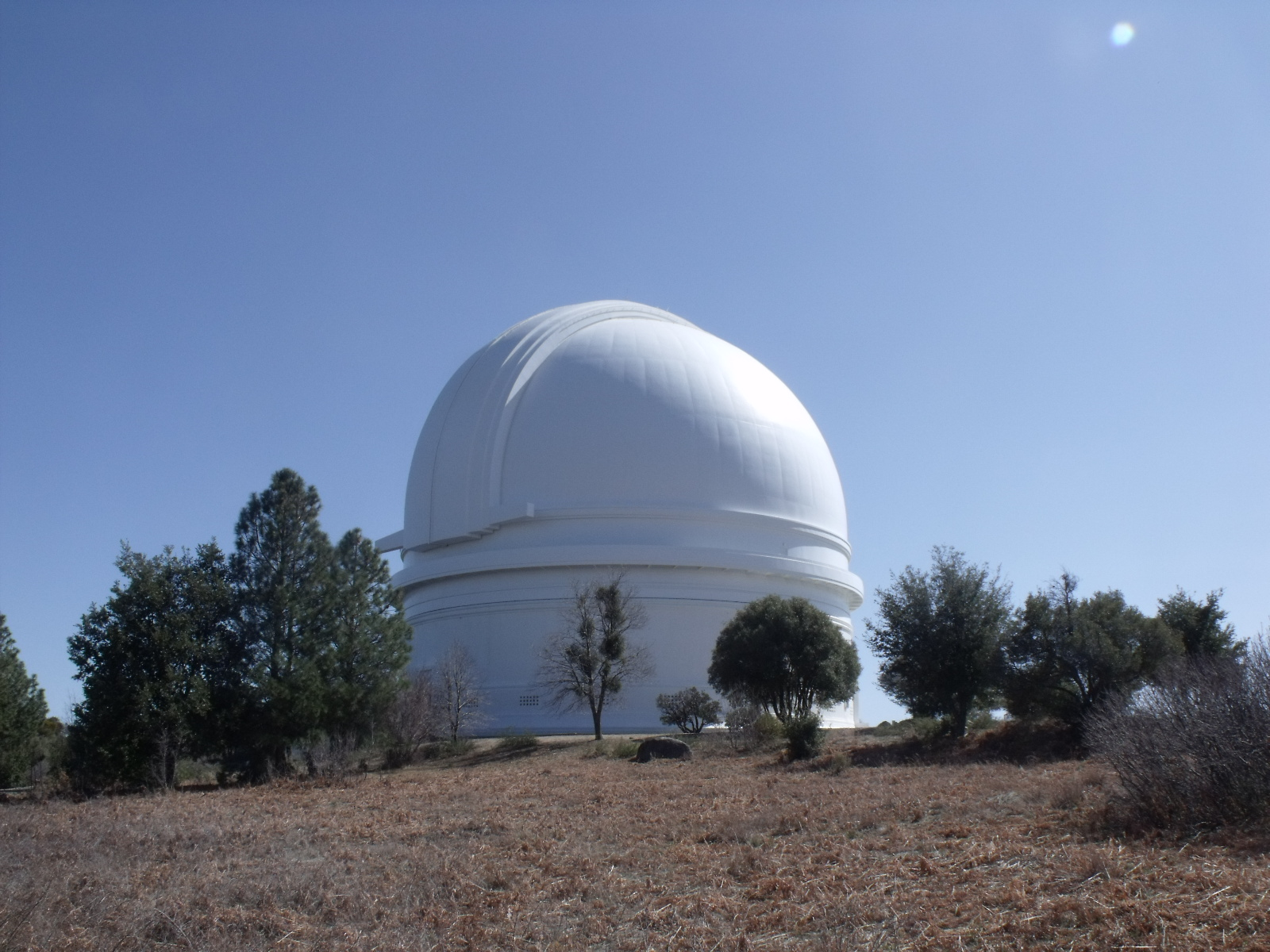
The Palomar Observatory confirmed findings suggesting that Kepler-14 was a binary star.

Kepler-14 was identified as a possible host to a planet during the first four months of Kepler's operational data, which began when NASA launched the satellite in April 2009. Kepler-14 was provisionally designated KOI-98. Because Kepler-14's transit signal seemed to imply that the possible planet had a short orbit and a clear effect on Kepler-14's brightness, the Kepler science team forwarded the candidate to the Kepler Follow-up Program (KFOP).

KFOP used the Fibre-fed Échelle Spectrograph (FIES) on the Nordic Optical Telescope to measure Kepler-14's radial velocity in October 2009. Other radial velocity measurements were collected using W.M. Keck Observatory. The FIES and Keck data, combined with speckle imaging data from WIYN Observatory and near-infrared adaptive optics measurements at Palomar Observatory and the MMT Observatory, revealed that Kepler-14 was actually a close binary star, something that radial velocity data alone could not recognize. Because of this new discovery, further investigation of Kepler-14 was postponed until after the publishing of the first five new Kepler planets (the ones orbiting Kepler-4, Kepler-5, Kepler-6, Kepler-7, and Kepler-8). Analysis of the data revealed that, of the two-component stars in the Kepler-14 system, both stars are of nearly equal magnitude, although one of the stars was fainter. The brighter star was designated the "A" component, and the fainter star received the "B" designation. The transit signal was observed in orbit around the A component of the system, meaning that the planetary candidate would be in orbit of the primary star of Kepler-14. This was confirmed on August 7, 2010, when the Infrared Array Camera on the Spitzer Space Telescope observed Kepler-14 to gather photometric data. Analysis of both the Spitzer photometric data and the radial velocity data confirmed the idea of a planet as the source of the transit signal. The planet was designated Kepler-14b, and this was published alongside the data and research on Kepler-14 in a June 2011 paper.

Kepler-14's nature as a close binary star was almost missed by the astronomers, and would not have been known if high-resolution imaging of the star had not been undertaken. The Kepler team acknowledged that a number of transiting planets' host stars may have actually been close visual binaries and that the assumed characteristics of the stars and their planets may be incorrect. As a result of their studies into Kepler-14, the Kepler team suggested the implementation of a high-resolution imaging campaign to re-examine transiting planet hosts, an effort that would require only a modest amount of telescope time.

== Characteristics ==
Kepler-14 is a binary star whose two components are separated by at least 280 astronomical units, or the distance between the Earth and Sun. The estimated orbital period of the Kepler-14 binary system is approximated at 2800 years. The two stars are of nearly equal brightness, but the primary component is slightly brighter as it has a more visible apparent magnitude, or its brightness as seen from Earth. The primary star has an estimated mass of 1.51 times that of the Sun, and the secondary has an estimated mass of 1.39 times the Sun's mass. The Kepler-14 system is 980 parsecs (3,196 light years) from Earth. It has an apparent magnitude of 12.12, and thus cannot be seen with the unaided eye.

As a result of the fact that Kepler-14 is so close-knit as seen from Earth, it was impossible for the discovery team to separate the two stars and analyze their characteristics as separate stars. The Kepler team analyzed their characteristics under the assumption that Kepler-14 was a single star. If Kepler-14 were a single star, it would be an F-type star with a mass of 1.512 times the Sun's, and a size that is 2.048 times the Sun's radius. As a single star, the effective temperature of Kepler-14 would be 6395 K, much hotter than the Sun, and the star's iron content would be 0.12, or 132% the amount found in the Sun. Assuming that Kepler-14's two stars formed at about the same time, their gyrochronological ages would be approximately 2.2 billion years.

== Planetary system ==
Kepler-14b is a Jupiter-like planet in the orbit of the primary star of Kepler-14. The planet is 8.4 times Jupiter's mass, the equivalent of 2670 times Earth's mass. The planet is slightly larger than Jupiter at 1.14 Jupiter radii The density of Kepler-14b is 7.1 g/cm^{3}, the second densest planet confirmed by the Kepler spacecraft after Kepler-10b. Kepler-14b completes an orbit every 6.79 days with a slightly irregular orbit indicated by its orbital eccentricity of 0.035.

Radial velocity measurements of host star did not reveal any additional planets as in 2018.

The Kepler-14 planetary system
Companion (in order from star)	Mass	Semimajor axis (AU)	Orbital period (days)	Eccentricity	Inclination	Radius
b	8.4 M_{J}	—	6.7901236131±0.0000003985	0.035	~90°	1.14 R_{J}
