= Kepler-39b =

Extrasolar object orbiting the star Kepler 39

Discovery
- Discovered by: François Bouchy et al.
- Discovery site: Haute-Provence
- Discovery date: Published August 3, 2011
- Detection method: radial velocity/transit

Orbital characteristics
- Semi-major axis: 0.155 (± 0.003) AU
- Eccentricity: 0.121 (± 0.023)
- Orbital period (sidereal): 21.0874 (± 0.0002) d
- Inclination: 88.83 ^{+0.59}_{−0.4}
- Argument of periastron: 98.9 ^{+5.9}_{−6.8}
- Star: Kepler-39

Physical characteristics
- Mean radius: 1.07±0.03 R_{J}
- Mass: 18.00 ^{+0.93}_{−0.91} M_{J}
- Mean density: 12.40 ^{+3.4}_{−2.6} g cm^{−3}
- Temperature: 905 K (632 °C; 1,169 °F)

Kepler-39b (formerly known as KOI-423b), is a confirmed extrasolar object (either a Jovian planet or brown dwarf because of its mass) discovered orbiting the F-type star Kepler-39. It is eighteen times more massive than Jupiter, and is about five fourths its size. The planet orbits its host star at about 15% of the average distance between the Earth and Sun. Kepler-39b's host star was investigated by European astronomers along with three other stars, including the host star of Kepler-40b, using equipment at the Haute-Provence Observatory in France. Collection and analysis of data in late 2010 led to the confirmation of Kepler-39b. The discovery paper was published in a journal on June 6, 2011.

The location of the subgiant star in the night sky is determined by the Right Ascension (R.A.) and Declination (Dec.), these are equivalent to the Longitude and Latitude on the Earth. The Right Ascension is how far expressed in time (hh:mm:ss) the star is along the celestial equator. If the R.A. is positive then its eastwards. The Declination is how far north or south the object is compared to the celestial equator and is expressed in degrees. For Kepler-39, the location is 19h 47m 50.00 and 46° 02` 04.00 .

== Characteristics ==
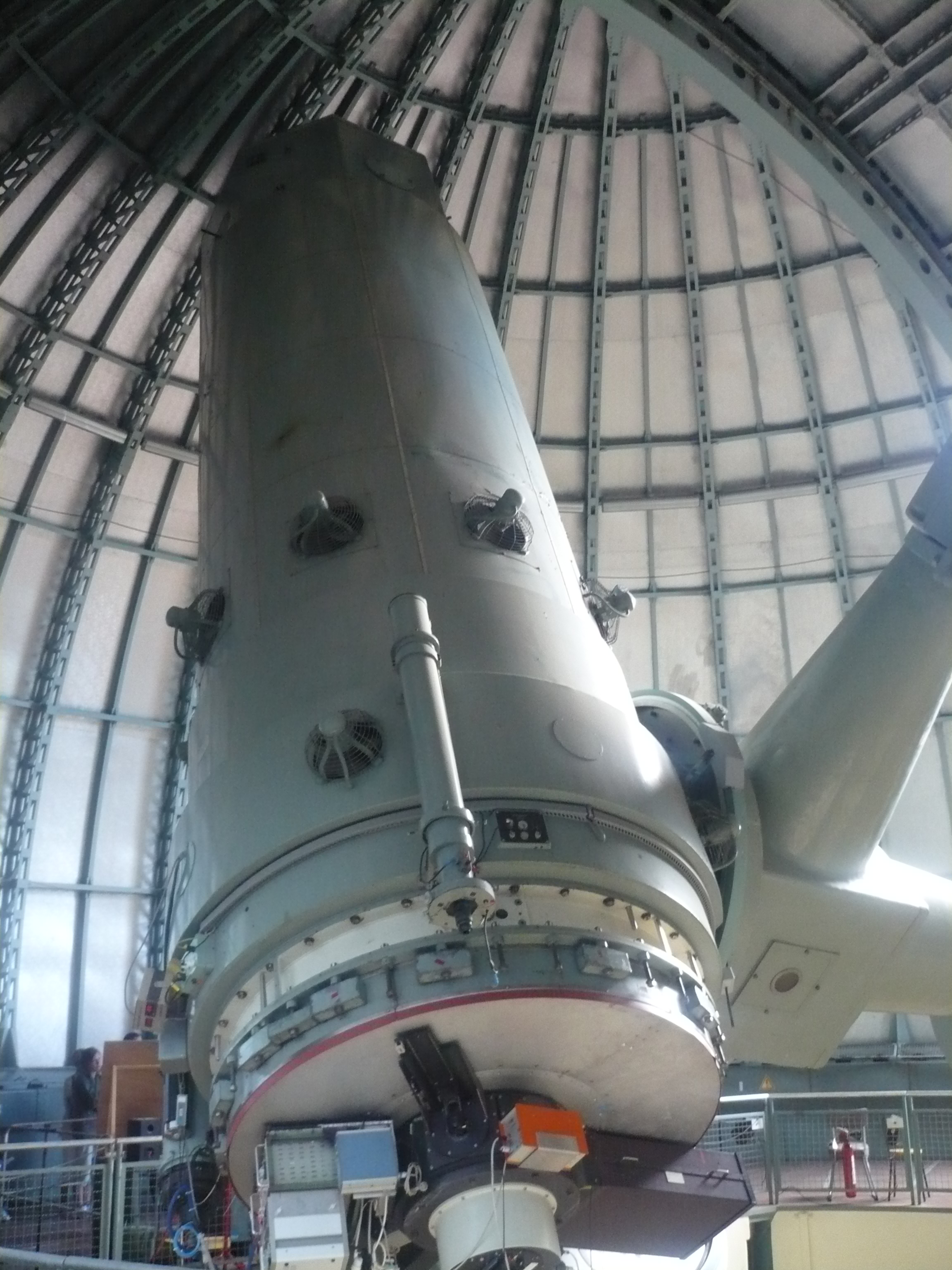
The telescope at Haute-Provence that was used to gather data on Kepler-39b and its host star.

=== Mass, radius, and temperature ===
Kepler-39b is a Jupiter-like planet or brown dwarf that is eighteen times more massive than Jupiter and 1.22 times Jupiter's size. For a planet of its size, Kepler-39b has a relatively cool equilibrium temperature of 905 K (632 °C; 1,169 °F) with respect to other inflated planets, defying most of the common models explaining inflation at the time of its discovery (including convection and the effect of stellar radiation). Although Kepler-39b and COROT-3b have similar characteristics (in terms of host star and mass), COROT-3b lies on the predicted size of what a planet of its character should look like. Kepler-39b is far larger than this model. A recent study reveals that Kepler-39b probably has a shape that is very oblate, which, if true, is very likely caused by its fast rotation. The estimated rotation period would be about 1.6 hours, very fast compared to about 10 hours for Jupiter and Saturn. Such a fast rotation also provides a natural explanation for its large radius.

In 2022, the radius of Kepler-39b was improved based on direct parallax measurements by the Gaia spacecraft, which allows the distance to the host star to be known. The newly-determined radius of 1.07 R_{J} is slightly lower than the previous estimate of 1.22 R_{J}.

=== Host star ===
Kepler-39 is an F-type star that is slightly larger and slightly more massive than the Sun (respectively, 1.10 solar masses and 1.39 solar radii) that is located 1090 parsecs (3,560 light years) away from Earth. With an effective temperature of 6260 K, Kepler-39 is hotter than the Sun. Kepler-39 is significantly metal-poor, reflected in its metallicity of [Fe/H] = -0.29 (51% the amount of iron found in the Sun).

Kepler-39 has an apparent magnitude of 14.3, and is thus not visible with the naked eye from Earth.

=== Orbital statistics ===
The planet orbits at a distance of 0.155 AU, equating to roughly 15% of the average distance between the Earth and Sun, completing one orbit every 21.0874 days. Kepler-39b has a modestly elliptical orbit, as described by its orbital eccentricity of 0.121. Its orbital inclination is 88.83º, making the planet appear almost entirely edge-on to its host star as seen from Earth.

== Discovery ==
The Kepler spacecraft is a NASA telescope equipped with photometric equipment. Launched in 2009, Kepler continuously watches 156,000 stars in a small area. A team of astronomers, hoping to learn more about hot jupiter planets and brown dwarfs, selected four F-type stars from the Kepler Input Catalog flagged as host to a Kepler Object of Interest (a transiting object that could possibly be a planet). Using three quarters of Kepler's data, the science team conducted a follow-up investigation in using the SOPHIE échelle spectrograph at the Haute-Provence Observatory in southern France, observing stars Kepler-40, Kepler-39, KOI-552 and KOI-410. Of these, conclusive evidence of a planet orbiting KOI-410 could not be found, and KOI-552 was found to be a binary star with an M-type companion. The Hot Jupiter KOI-428b was the first of these four to be confirmed.

SOPHIE collected thirteen radial velocity measurements of Kepler-39 between July 26, 2010 and September 10, 2010. Seven of the measurements were affected by moonlight, but were corrected. These radial velocity measurements conclusively eliminated the possibility that the observed dips in Kepler-39's brightness were caused by the movements of binary stars and confirming the existence of planet Kepler-39b in the process. SOPHIE's measurements were used to derive Kepler-39's spectrum, which was used to define Kepler-39b's characteristics.

The astronomers submitted the discovery paper to Astronomy and Astrophysics on June 16, 2011 with François Bouchy as the leading author. The discovery paper covered the investigations of KOI-410 and KOI-552 along with the discovery of Kepler-39b.
