= Kepler-40b =

Extrasolar planet

Discovery
- Discovered by: Alexandre Santerne et al.
- Discovery site: Haute-Provence Observatory
- Discovery date: 4 January 2011 (published)
- Detection method: Transit method

Orbital characteristics
- Star: Kepler-40

Physical characteristics
- Mean radius: 1.17 (± 0.04) R_{J} 13.12 R_{🜨}
- Mass: 2.2 (± 0.4) M_{J} (700 M_{🜨})
- Mean density: 1.68 ^{+0.53}_{−0.43} g cm^{−3}
- Temperature: 2327^{+195}_{−669} K.

Kepler-40b, formerly known as KOI-428b, is a hot Jupiter discovered in orbit around the star Kepler-40, which is about to become a red giant. The planet was first noted as a transit event by NASA's Kepler spacecraft. The Kepler team made data collected by its satellite publicly available, including data on Kepler-40; French and Swiss astronomers used the equivalent to one night of measurements on the SOPHIE échelle spectrograph to collect all the data needed to show that a planet was producing the periodic dimming of Kepler-40. The planet, Kepler-40b, is twice the mass of Jupiter and slightly larger than it in size, making it as dense as Neptune. The planet is also nearly thirteen times hotter than Jupiter and orbits five times closer to its star than Mercury is from the Sun.

== Observational history ==
Kepler-40 was first observed by the Kepler spacecraft, a NASA satellite that searches for planets in transit (crossing in front of and dimming) their host stars, from May 13, 2009, to June 15, 2009 in its first days of operation. The resulting light curve was made available to the public by the Kepler science team, revealing four transit events over 33.5 days.

A team composed of astronomers from France and Switzerland used the SOPHIE échelle spectrograph at the Haute-Provence Observatory in southern France to examine Kepler-40. SOPHIE uses radial velocity measurements to examine stars for exoplanets. After background light was removed and alternative causes for radial velocity variations were disproved (for example, that Kepler-40 was actually a close binary star), the team used SOPHIE to analyze the properties of the actual star. The astronomers observing the star found that it is nearing the main sequence turn-off (the star fuses the last of its hydrogen and becomes a red giant). The establishment of stellar parameters helped the astronomers extrapolate the exoplanet's parameters and prove the existence of Kepler-40b. The discovered planet was the sixth transiting planet to have been discovered in orbit around stars with a radius of more than 1.8 times that of the Sun, after planets including Kepler-5 and Kepler-7.

The discovery of Kepler-40b demonstrated that smaller telescopes, such as SOPHIE, are effective when used as follow-ups to space missions like Kepler. The team of astronomers spent what amounted roughly to one night on a 1.93d-meter telescope and gathered all the data needed to establish Kepler-40b's existence and parameters. Kepler-40b was published in the journal Astronomy and Astrophysics on January 4, 2011, after it was sent to the journal on September 15, 2010.

== Host star ==
Kepler-40 is an F-type evolved subgiant star located in the constellation Cygnus. The star is 1.48 times the mass of the Sun and 2.13 times its radius. With an effective temperature of 6510 K, Kepler-40 is larger, more massive, more diffuse, and hotter than the Sun is. The metallicity of Kepler-40, [Fe/H] = 0.10, means that it has 25.9 % more iron than is measured in the Sun. Kepler-40 is nearing the main sequence turn-off; in other words, it is about to fuse the last of its hydrogen and become a red giant.

Kepler-40 hosts the sixth planetary system to be discovered in the orbit of a star with a mass of over 1.8 solar masses. It lies approximately 2500 parsecs (8100 light years) away from Earth.

== Characteristics ==
Kepler-40b is a Hot Jupiter that is estimated to be 2.2 times the mass of Jupiter (over 700 times the mass of Earth), but 1.17 times Jupiter's radius (13.12 times the radius of Earth). Thus, the planet has a density of 1.68 grams per cubic centimeter, similar to that of Neptune (1.638 g/cm^{3}). The planet's equilibrium temperature was initially estimated to be 1620 K, thirteen times hotter than Jupiter's equilibrium temperature. In 2015, the planetary nightside temperature was modeled to be even hotter at 2327^{+195}_{−669} K.

Kepler-40b orbits its star every 6.87 days at an average distance of 0.081 AU. It also has an orbital inclination of 89.7°, meaning that it can be seen nearly edge-on with respect to Earth. In comparison, Mercury orbits the Sun every 87.97 days at an average distance of 0.387 AU; therefore, Kepler-40b's orbit is approximately thirteen times faster than that of Mercury's and five times closer to its host star than Mercury is to the Sun.
