= Kepler-40 =

F-type star in the constellation Cygnus

Observation data Epoch J2000 Equinox ICRS
- Constellation: Cygnus
- Right ascension: 19^{h} 47^{m} 15.2874^{s}
- Declination: +47° 31′ 35.665″
- Apparent magnitude (V): 14.58 (± 0.02)

Characteristics
- Evolutionary stage: subgiant
- Spectral type: F5IV
- V−R color index: −0.31
- R−I color index: +0.87
- J−H color index: 0.242
- J−K color index: 0.266

Astrometry
Proper motion (μ)	RA: −1.469(22) mas/yr Dec.: −6.768(20) mas/yr
Parallax (π)	0.4550±0.0168 mas
Distance	7,200 ± 300 ly (2,200 ± 80 pc)

Details
Mass	1.48 M_{☉}
Radius	2.13 R_{☉}
Luminosity	7.3 L_{☉}
Surface gravity (log g)	3.89 cgs
Temperature	5,999 K
Metallicity [Fe/H]	0.17 dex
Rotation	14.48 days
Rotational velocity (v sin i)	9.0 km/s
Age	2.8 Gyr

Other designations
- KIC 10418224, 2MASS 19471528+4731357, KOI-428

Database references
SIMBAD	data

Kepler-40, formerly known as KOI-428, is an F-type star in the constellation Cygnus. Kepler-40 is known to host at least one planet, Kepler-40b. The star is approximately 1.5 times more massive than the Sun, and is over two times its size; it was, at upon its discovery, the largest yet discovered with a transiting planet in its orbit. Kepler-40 was first noted as home to a possible transiting object by the Kepler spacecraft; the data on the system was released to the public. A team of French and Swiss scientists used follow-up data to determine the existence of the Hot Jupiter planet Kepler-40b, and later had their results published in a scientific journal on January 4, 2011.

== Observational history ==
Kepler-40 was first targeted by the Kepler spacecraft, an Earth-trailing NASA operation that searches for planets that transit, or cross in front of, their host stars. It was labeled a Kepler Object of Interest (KOI) during the satellite's first 33.5 days of operations, which stretched from mid-May to mid-June 2009, because of the detection of a potential transit event. The data collected by Kepler's photometer was publicly released, including data on Kepler-40 and its possible transiting companion.

Data on Kepler-40 was analyzed by a team of French and Swiss astronomers, who first tested for false positives. When all obvious false positives were cleared, the science team used the SOPHIE échelle spectrograph at the Haute-Provence Observatory in southern France to gather radial velocity measurements on the star. Collected data was then checked to see if it corresponded with that of a closely orbiting binary star or that of a planet; it was found to be that of a planet, leading to the confirmation of Kepler-40b.

After Kepler-40b was confirmed, the French and Swiss science team worked to clarify the stellar parameters its star by analyzing the star's spectrum as collected by SOPHIE. Kepler-40 is the sixth known planetary host star with a radius of more than 1.8 times that of the Sun. At the time of its discovery, Kepler-40 was the most evolved star known to have a transiting planet.

Kepler-40 and its exoplanet were published in the journal Astronomy and Astrophysics on January 4, 2011, after being submitted on September 15, 2010.

== Characteristics ==
Kepler-40 is an F-type star that has 1.48 times the mass of the Sun and 2.13 times its radius. The star has an effective temperature of 5,999 K, making it hotter than the Sun. Its metallicity of [Fe/H] = 0.10 means that Kepler-40 has 1.26 times as much iron as the Sun does.

Kepler-40 was, at the time of its discovery, the largest and most evolved star known to host a transiting planet. It is the sixth known host star with a radius over 1.8 times that of the Sun and a transiting planet, after stars that include Kepler-5 and Kepler-7.

Kepler-40 lies approximately 2200 parsecs (7,200 light years) away from Earth, further than any star (with a known distance) with an exoplanet previously discovered by Kepler. With an apparent magnitude of 14.58, it was also dimmer than any star previously recognized by Kepler. Because of its low apparent magnitude, Kepler-40 cannot be seen with the naked eye.

== Planetary system ==
Kepler-40b is the first (and only) planet discovered so far in the orbit of Kepler-40. It has a mass that is 2.2 times that of Jupiter's, the rough equivalent of 700 Earths. The planet also has a radius that is 1.17 times that of Jupiter and a density of 1.68 grams/cm^{3}. Kepler-40b has an equilibrium temperature of 1620 K, over six times hotter than the equilibrium temperature of Earth. It orbits its star every 6.87 days at a distance of 0.081 AU.

The Kepler-40 planetary system
Companion (in order from star)	Mass	Semimajor axis (AU)	Orbital period (days)	Eccentricity	Inclination (°)	Radius
b	2.2 M_{J}	0.081	6.8731697	(0)	85.47±0.94	—
