= Kepler-39 =

Star in the constellation Cygnus

Observation data Epoch J2000 Equinox ICRS
- Constellation: Cygnus
- Right ascension: 19^{h} 47^{m} 50.4746^{s}
- Declination: +46° 02′ 03.500″
- Apparent magnitude (V): 14.3

Characteristics
- Evolutionary stage: main sequence
- Spectral type: F7V

Astrometry
Proper motion (μ)	RA: 3.894(18) mas/yr Dec.: −2.345(17) mas/yr
Parallax (π)	0.9316±0.0139 mas
Distance	3,500 ± 50 ly (1,070 ± 20 pc)

Details
Mass	1.29+0.06 −0.07 M_{☉}
Radius	1.40±0.10 R_{☉}
Surface gravity (log g)	4.25±0.06 cgs
Temperature	6350±100 K
Metallicity [Fe/H]	0.10±0.14 dex
Rotation	4.464±0.013 days
Rotational velocity (v sin i)	16±2.5 km/s
Age	2.1+0.8 −0.9 Gyr

Other designations
- KOI-423, KIC 9478990, 2MASS J19475046+4602034, Gaia DR2 2080168561154800384

Database references
SIMBAD	data
KIC	data

Kepler-39 (2MASS J19475046+4602034) is an F-type main sequence star located in the constellation Cygnus. It is located about 3,500 light-years (1,070 parsecs) away. One known substellar companion orbits it, Kepler-39b.

== Planetary system ==
Kepler-39b is generally considered a brown dwarf rather than a planet since it does not meet the standard definition of planet. Some authorities such as the Extrasolar Planets Encyclopaedia and the NASA Exoplanet Archive include it among their list of confirmed planets.

The Kepler-39 planetary system
Companion (in order from star)	Mass	Semimajor axis (AU)	Orbital period (days)	Eccentricity	Inclination (°)	Radius
b	20.1+1.3 −1.2 M_{J}	0.164±0.003	21.087210±0.000037	0.112±0.057	89.07±0.22	1.24+0.09 −0.10 R_{J}
