= Kepler-9d =

Super-Earth orbiting Kepler-9

- Kepler-9d with Earth and Jupiter compared to size.

Discovery
- Discovery date: 1 January 2011
- Detection method: Transit (Kepler Mission)

Orbital characteristics
- Semi-major axis: 0.02730 AU (4,084,000 km)
- Eccentricity: 0
- Orbital period (sidereal): 1.592851 d
- Star: Kepler-9 (KOI-377)

Physical characteristics
- Mean radius: 1.64 R_{🜨}
- Temperature: 2026

Kepler-9d (formerly known as KOI-377.03) is a planet in orbit around the Sun-like star Kepler-9. Initially discovered by Kepler space telescope, a terrestrial planet-searching satellite built and operated by NASA, Kepler-9d is most likely a Super-Earth, with an estimated radius approximately 60% larger than that of Earth's, although its exact mass cannot be determined. Kepler-9d orbits Kepler-9 every 1.56 days at a distance of .0273 AU from its star, an extremely close distance. Although Kepler-9d is the closest planet to its star in its system, it is named Kepler-9d instead of Kepler-9b because two gas giants, Kepler-9b and Kepler-9c, were confirmed first. The original studies into the system first suggested that Kepler-9d might be a planet, but a follow-up investigation made by the Kepler team later confirmed that it was; the confirmation of Kepler-9d as a planet was made public with the team's paper, which was published in the Astrophysical Journal on January 1, 2011. The team used telescopes at the W.M. Keck Observatory in Hawaii to follow up on the Kepler space telescope's initial discovery.

== Discovery and name ==
Kepler-9d's name comes from it being the third planet discovered in the orbit of Kepler-9. Kepler-9 was named for the Kepler spacecraft, a NASA satellite that aims to discover terrestrial planets in transit around, or crossing in front of, their host stars as seen from Earth. This transit causes a regular interval in which the star briefly and slightly dims as the planet crosses it.

Flagged initially as a transit event by the satellite, Kepler-9d was given the designation KOI 377.03. It was recognized as a potential planet after a study into the system confirmed Kepler-9b and Kepler-9c, but follow-up studies had to be completed to verify that it was indeed a planet, and that the apparent transit event was not due to a background eclipsing binary star in the aperture of Kepler's photometer. Kepler's team exhaustively disproved that the small transit event could have been anything but a planet, and their results were published in the Astrophysical Journal on January 1, 2011. Follow-up observations were conducted by the High Resolution Echelle Spectrometer at the W.M. Keck Observatory in Hawaii, as well as the WIYN Observatory in Arizona and the Palomar Observatory in California.

== Host star ==
Kepler-9 is a Sun-like star in the constellation Lyra that lies some 640 parsecs away from Earth. With a mass of 1.07 M_{☉} and a radius of 1.02 R_{☉}, Kepler-9 is almost exactly the same size and width of the Sun, being only 7% more massive and 2% wider. Kepler-9 has an effective temperature of 5777 (± 61) K, as compared to the Sun's at 5778 K, and is approximately 32% more metal-rich (in terms of iron) than the Sun. Kepler-9 is younger than the Sun, and is estimated to be one billion years old. Kepler-9 has two planets other than Kepler-9d: the gas giants Kepler-9b and Kepler-9c.

== Characteristics ==
Based on the size of its light curve, Kepler-9d is assumed to be a Super-Earth, although its exact mass is not known. It is presumed to be at least 1.5 Earth masses. The planet's radius is inferred to be 1.64 R_{E}, or approximately 64% larger than Earth's radius. With an equilibrium temperature of 2026 K, it is hotter than all the previous planets discovered by Kepler (not counting the three previously discovered ones located in its field of view). Its density is not known. With an average distance of .0273 AU (2,537,695.73 miles) from its star, which it orbits every 1.592851 days, Kepler-9d is the closest planet to its star in the Kepler-9 system. To compare, the planet Mercury is .3871 AU away from the Sun, which it orbits every 87.97 days.
