= Kepler-4 =

Star in the constellation Draco

Observation data Epoch J2000 Equinox J2000
- Constellation: Draco
- Right ascension: 19^{h} 02^{m} 27.6980^{s}
- Declination: +50° 08′ 08.704″
- Apparent magnitude (V): 12.7

Characteristics
- Evolutionary stage: subgiant
- Spectral type: G0

Astrometry
Proper motion (μ)	RA: 6.127(12) mas/yr Dec.: 4.642(13) mas/yr
Parallax (π)	2.0055±0.0103 mas
Distance	1,626 ± 8 ly (499 ± 3 pc)

Details
Mass	1.117+0.021 −0.029 M_{☉}
Radius	1.555±0.012 R_{☉}
Luminosity	2.505+0.142 −0.124 L_{☉}
Surface gravity (log g)	4.102+0.005 −0.004 cgs
Temperature	5781±76 K
Metallicity [Fe/H]	0.09±0.10 dex
Age	6.71+0.77 −0.67 Gyr

Other designations
- KOI-7, KIC 11853905, GSC 03549-02067, 2MASS J19022767+5008087

Database references
SIMBAD	data
KIC	data

Kepler-4 is a sunlike star located about 1626 light-years away in the constellation Draco. It is in the field of view of the Kepler Mission, a NASA operation purposed with finding Earth-like planets. Kepler-4b, a Neptune-sized planet that orbits extremely close to its star, was discovered in its orbit and made public by the Kepler team on January 4, 2010. Kepler-4b was the first discovery by the Kepler satellite, and its confirmation helped to demonstrate the spacecraft's effectiveness.

== Nomenclature and history ==
Kepler-4 is named for the Kepler spacecraft, a NASA telescope tasked with finding Earth-like planets that transit their stars as seen from Earth. As the previous three planets that Kepler confirmed had already been confirmed by others, Kepler-4 and its planet were the first to be discovered by the Kepler team. The star and its system were announced in Washington, D.C. at the 215th meeting of the American Astronomical Society on January 4, 2010, along with Kepler-5, Kepler-6, Kepler-7, and Kepler-8. Of the presented planets, Kepler-4b was the smallest, around the size of planet Neptune. The discovery of Kepler-4b and the other planets presented at the AAS meeting helped to confirm that the Kepler spacecraft was indeed functional.

The Harlan J. Smith Telescope at McDonald Observatory in Fort Davis, Texas was used by astronomers from the University of Texas at Austin to follow up on Kepler's discoveries and confirm them. Telescopes in Hawaii, California, Arizona, and the Canary Islands were also used to confirm the findings.

== Characteristics ==
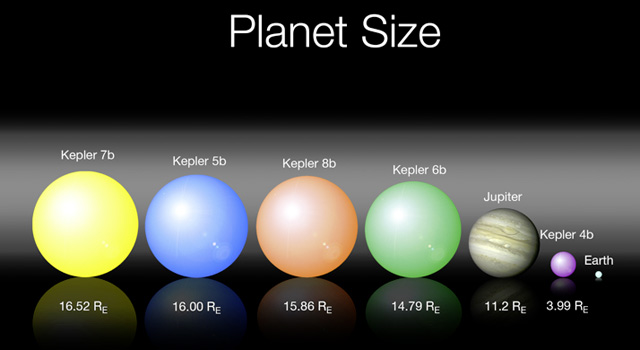
A picture showing the relative sizes of the first five planets discovered by Kepler. Kepler-4b is the smallest of the five, highlighted in purple.

Kepler-4 is a G0-type star, which is similar to the Sun, except slightly brighter. The star is 1.117 M_{sun} and 1.555 R_{sun}, or 111% the mass of and 155% the radius of the Sun. With a metallicity of .09 (± 0.10) [Fe/H], Kepler-4 is more metal-rich than the Sun, a figure that is important in that metal-rich stars tend to have orbiting planets more often than metal-poor stars. Kepler-4 is also about 6.7 billion years old. In comparison, the Sun is 4.6 billion years old. In addition, Kepler-4 has an effective temperature of 5781 (± 76) K, which is almost identical, within the errors, to that of the Sun, which is 5778 K.

As seen from Earth, Kepler-4 has an apparent magnitude of 12.7. It is, as a result, not visible with the naked eye.

== Planetary system ==
Kepler-4b's discovery was announced on January 4, 2010. It is the size of planet Neptune, at 0.077 M_{J} (7% the mass of Jupiter) and 0.357 R_{J} (36% the radius of Jupiter). The planet orbits its star every 3.213 days at 0.045 AU from the star. This distance compares to planet Mercury, which is 0.39 AU from the Sun. Kepler-4's eccentricity was assumed to be 0, however a subsequent independent reanalysis of the discovery data found a value of 0.25 ± 0.12. Likewise, the temperature of the planet is assumed to be 1650 K, far hotter than Jupiter's, which is assumed to be 124 K (not considering its internal heat and atmosphere).

A search for transit-timing variations in all 17 quarters of Kepler data did not detect any evidence of additional planets.

The Kepler-4 planetary system
Companion (in order from star)	Mass	Semimajor axis (AU)	Orbital period (days)	Eccentricity	Inclination (°)	Radius
b	0.077±0.012 M_{J}	0.0456±0.0009	3.21346±0.00022	0.25±0.12	89.76+0.24 −2.05	0.357±0.019 R_{J}

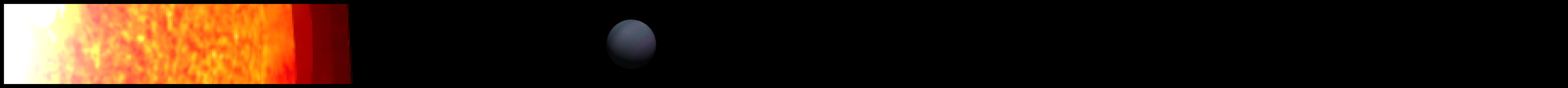
Kepler-4 System.

== See also ==
- List of extrasolar planets
- Kepler Mission
