= Kepler-8 =

Star in the constellation Lyra

Observation data Epoch J2000 Equinox ICRS
- Constellation: Lyra
- Right ascension: 18^{h} 45^{m} 09.1490^{s}
- Declination: +42° 27′ 03.891″
- Apparent magnitude (V): 13.9

Characteristics
- Evolutionary stage: main sequence
- Spectral type: F5V

Astrometry
Proper motion (μ)	RA: 2.176(12) mas/yr Dec.: 3.851(14) mas/yr
Parallax (π)	0.9842±0.0105 mas
Distance	3,310 ± 40 ly (1,020 ± 10 pc)

Details
Mass	1.213 M_{☉}
Radius	1.486 R_{☉}
Temperature	6213 K
Age	3.84 Gyr

Other designations
- KOI-10, KIC 6922244, 2MASS J18450914+4227038

Database references
SIMBAD	data
KIC	data

Kepler-8 is a star located in the constellation Lyra in the field of view of the Kepler Mission, a NASA-led operation tasked with discovering terrestrial planets. The star, which is slightly hotter, larger, and more massive than the Sun, has one gas giant in its orbit, Kepler-8b. This gas giant is larger than Jupiter, but is less massive, and thus more diffuse. The planet's discovery was announced to the public on January 4, 2010 along with four other planets. As the fifth confirmed planetary system verified by Kepler, it helped demonstrate the capabilities of the Kepler spacecraft.

== Nomenclature and history ==
Kepler-8 was named the way it was because it is home to the eighth planetary system confirmed during the course of the Kepler Mission, a NASA-directed program tasked with searching a region of the sky for terrestrial planets that transit, or cross in front of (and thereby, for a while, make dimmer) the stars that they orbit with respect to Earth. The planet in orbit around Kepler-8, Kepler-8b, was the fifth of the first five planets discovered by the Kepler spacecraft; the first three planets confirmed by Kepler had been previously discovered, and were only used to verify the accuracy of Kepler's measurements. Kepler-8b's discovery was announced to the public on January 4, 2010 at the 215th meeting of the American Astronomical Society in Washington, D.C., alongside planets in orbit around Kepler-4, Kepler-5, Kepler-6, and Kepler-7.

The data that was used to identify Kepler-8b's existence was re-examined and verified by observatories in Hawaii, Arizona, Texas, California, and the Canary Islands.

== Characteristics ==
Kepler-8 is situated some 1020 pc (or 3,300 light years) from Earth. With a mass of 1.213 M_{sun} and a radius of 1.486 R_{sun}, Kepler-8 is more massive than the Sun by about a fifth of the Sun's mass, and is nearly three halves its size. The star is predicted to be 3.84 (± 1.5) billion years old, compared to the Sun's age at 4.6 billion years. Kepler-8 has a metallicity of [Fe/H] = -0.055 (± 0.03), making it 12% less metal-rich than the metal-rich Sun; metallicity is important in stars because stars richer in metal are more likely to harbor planets. The star also has an effective temperature of 6213 (± 150) K, meaning that it is hotter than the Sun, which has an effective temperature of 5778 K.

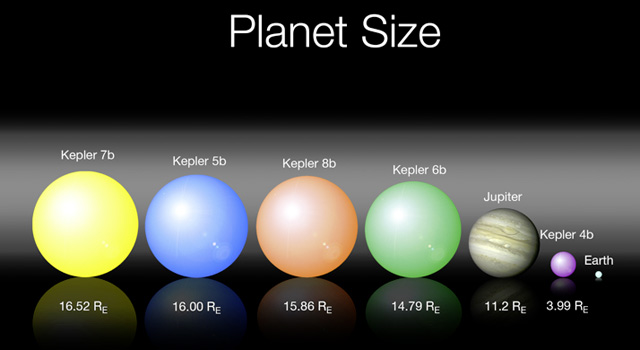
The first five planets discovered by Kepler, compared by relative size. Kepler-8b is depicted in orange.

Kepler-8 has an apparent magnitude of 13.9; in other words, as seen from Earth, Kepler-8 is an extremely dim star. It cannot be seen with the naked eye.

== Planetary system ==
Kepler-8b is the only planet that has been discovered orbiting of Kepler-8. With a mass of .603 M_{J} and a radius of 1.419 R_{J}, the planet is 60% the mass of, but 42% larger than planet Jupiter. The planet is diffuse, with a density of .261 grams/cc, especially in comparison to Jupiter and its density of 5.515 grams/cc. At a distance of .0483 AU, Kepler-8b orbits its star every 3.5225 days. The eccentricity of Kepler-8 is assumed to be 0, which would give the planet a circular orbit. In comparison, planet Mercury orbits the Sun at .3871 AU every 87.97 days. Mercury also has an elliptical orbit, with an eccentricity of .2056.

The Kepler-8 planetary system
Companion (in order from star)	Mass	Semimajor axis (AU)	Orbital period (days)	Eccentricity	Inclination (°)	Radius
b	0.603 M_{J}	0.0483	3.5225	0	—	1.419 R_{J}

== See also ==
- List of extrasolar planets
- Kepler Mission
- Hot Jupiter
