= Kepler-6 =

G-type star in the constellation Cygnus

Observation data Epoch J2000 Equinox ICRS
- Constellation: Cygnus
- Right ascension: 19^{h} 47^{m} 20.9380^{s}
- Declination: +48° 14′ 23.759″
- Apparent magnitude (V): 13.8

Characteristics
- Apparent magnitude (J): 12.001±0.021
- Apparent magnitude (H): 11.706±0.019
- Apparent magnitude (K): 11.634±0.019

Astrometry
Proper motion (μ)	RA: 0.935(11) mas/yr Dec.: 8.458(12) mas/yr
Parallax (π)	1.7108±0.0102 mas
Distance	1,910 ± 10 ly (585 ± 3 pc)

Details
Mass	1.209 M_{☉}
Radius	1.391 R_{☉}
Temperature	5647 K
Age	3.8 Gyr

Other designations
- KOI-17, KIC 10874614, 2MASS J19472094+4814238

Database references
SIMBAD	data
KIC	data

Kepler-6 is a G-type star situated in the constellation Cygnus. The star lies within the field of view of the Kepler Mission, which discovered it as part of a NASA-led mission to discover Earth-like planets. The star, which is slightly larger, more metal-rich, slightly cooler, and more massive than the Sun, is orbited by at least one extrasolar planet, a Jupiter-sized planet named Kepler-6b that orbits closely to its star.

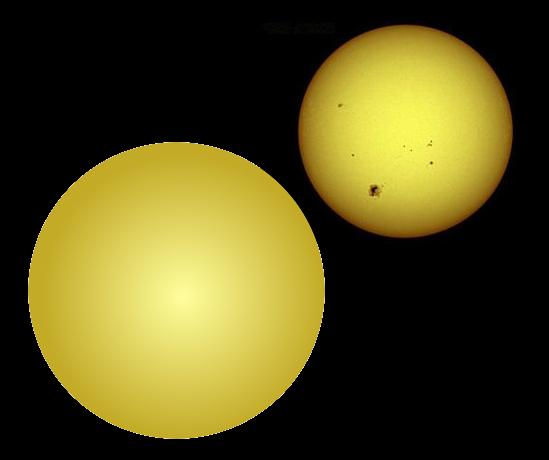
Kepler-6

== Nomenclature and history ==
Kepler-6 was named for the Kepler Mission, a NASA project launched in 2009 that aims to discover Earth-like planets that transit, or cross in front of, their home stars with respect to Earth. Unlike stars like the Sun or Sirius, Kepler-6 does not have a common and colloquial name. The discovery of Kepler-6b was announced by the Kepler team on January 4, 2010 at the 215th meeting of the American Astronomical Society along with planets around Kepler-4, Kepler-5, Kepler-7, and Kepler-8. It was the third planet to be discovered by the Kepler spacecraft; the first three planets to be verified by data from Kepler had been previously discovered. These three planets were used to test the accuracy of Kepler's measurements.

The discovery of Kepler-6 was confirmed by follow-up observations made using the Hobby–Eberly and Smith telescopes in Texas; the Keck 1 telescope in Hawaii; the Hale and Shane telescopes in southern California; the WIYN, MMT, and Tillinghast telescopes in Arizona; and the Nordic Optical Telescope in the Canary Islands.

== Characteristics ==
Kepler-6 is a star that is approximately 1.209 M_{sun}, or some five-fourths the mass of the Sun. It is also wider than the sun, with a radius of 1.391 R_{sun}, or seven-fifths of that of the Sun. The star is approximately 3.8 billion years old, and has an effective temperature of 5647 K (9,705 °F). In comparison, the Sun has a slightly warmer temperature of 5778 K. Kepler-6 has a metallicity of [Fe/H] = +0.34, making it 2.2 times more metallic than the Sun. On average, metal-rich stars tend to be more likely to have planets and planetary systems.

The star, as seen from Earth, has an apparent magnitude of 13.8. It is not visible with the naked eye. In comparison, Pluto's apparent magnitude at its brightest is slightly brighter, at 13.65.

== Planetary system ==
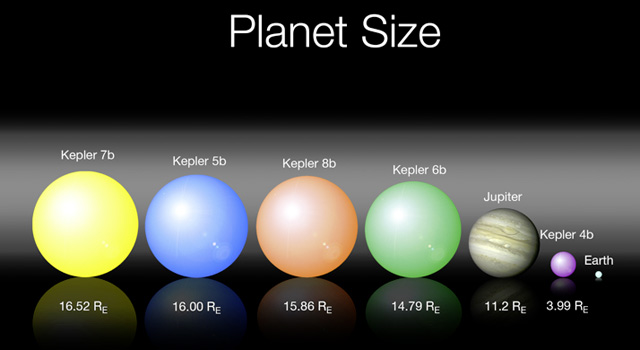
A picture showing the relative sizes of the first five planets discovered by Kepler. Kepler-6b is just larger than Jupiter, represented in green.

Kepler-6 has one confirmed extrasolar planet; it is a gas giant named Kepler-6b. The planet is approximately .669 M_{J}, or some two-thirds the mass of planet Jupiter. It is also slightly more diffuse than Jupiter, with a radius of approximately 1.323 R_{J}. Kepler-6b orbits at an average distance of .0456 AU from its star, and completes an orbit every 3.234 days. The eccentricity of the planet's orbit is assumed to be 0, which is that of a circular orbit.

The Kepler-6 planetary system
Companion (in order from star)	Mass	Semimajor axis (AU)	Orbital period (days)	Eccentricity	Inclination (°)	Radius
b	0.669 M_{J}	0.04567	3.2347	0	—	1.323 R_{J}

== See also ==
- List of extrasolar planets
- Kepler Mission
