= Kepler-1658 =

Triple star system in the constellation Cygnus

Observation data Epoch J2000 Equinox ICRS
- Constellation: Cygnus
- Right ascension: 18^{h} 46^{m} 22.24188^{s}
- Declination: +75° 26′ 02.2400″
- Apparent magnitude (V): 11.556±0.100

Characteristics

A
- Evolutionary stage: Subgiant
- Spectral type: F5

BC
- Evolutionary stage: main sequence
- Spectral type: KV + MV
- Variable type: eclipsing binary

Astrometry
Radial velocity (R_{v})	−21.815±0.053 km/s
Proper motion (μ)	RA: +0.100 mas/yr Dec.: −5.542 mas/yr
Parallax (π)	1.2260±0.0173 mas
Distance	2,660 ± 40 ly (820 ± 10 pc)

Orbit
Primary	A
Name	BC
Semi-major axis (a)	50 AU

Orbit
Primary	B
Name	C
Period (P)	3.849363145 days

Details

Kepler-1658 A
Mass	1.45±0.03 M_{☉}
Radius	3.26±0.14 R_{☉}
Surface gravity (log g)	4.13±0.05 cgs
Temperature	5,948±100 K
Metallicity [Fe/H]	−0.27±0.06 dex
Rotational velocity (v sin i)	38 km/s
Age	2.0±0.1 Gyr

Kepler-1658 B
Mass	0.75 M_{☉}

Kepler-1658 C
Mass	0.19 M_{☉}
Radius	0.23 R_{☉}

Other designations
- KOI-4, KIC 3861595, TIC 377873569, TYC 3135-652-1

Database references
SIMBAD	data

Kepler-1658 is a triple star system located in the constellation Cygnus. Based on parallax measurements by the Gaia spacecraft, it is located at a distance of 2,660 light-years (820 parsecs).

This is an hierarchical triple system whose primary is an F-type subgiant star with 1.45 times the Sun's mass and 3.26 times the Sun's radius. The outer system, 50 astronomical units away from the primary, is an eclipsing binary whose components have an orbital period of 3.8 days: star B is probably a K-type dwarf with 0.8 times the Sun's mass, and star C a red dwarf with 0.19 times the mass of the Sun and 0.23 times the radius.

== Search for planets ==
In 2009, a hot Jupiter planet candidate (KOI-4.01, now known as Kepler-1658b) was identified around Kepler-1658 by the Kepler space telescope via the transit method. Initially ruled out as a false alarm, a 2019 study re-claimed its nature as a planet. This would be the first planet ever detected by Kepler. Analysis of the Transiting Exoplanet Survey Satellite (TESS) data in 2022 showed that it is gradually spiraling into its star, with its orbit decaying. However, in 2025 it was demonstrated that Kepler-1658b is a false positive planet. In reality, all the data that supported the detection of a planet with physical orbital decay were caused by the eclipsing outer system, whose light travel time effect is responsible for the supposed orbital decay.
