= Kepler-9 =

Star located in the constellation Lyra

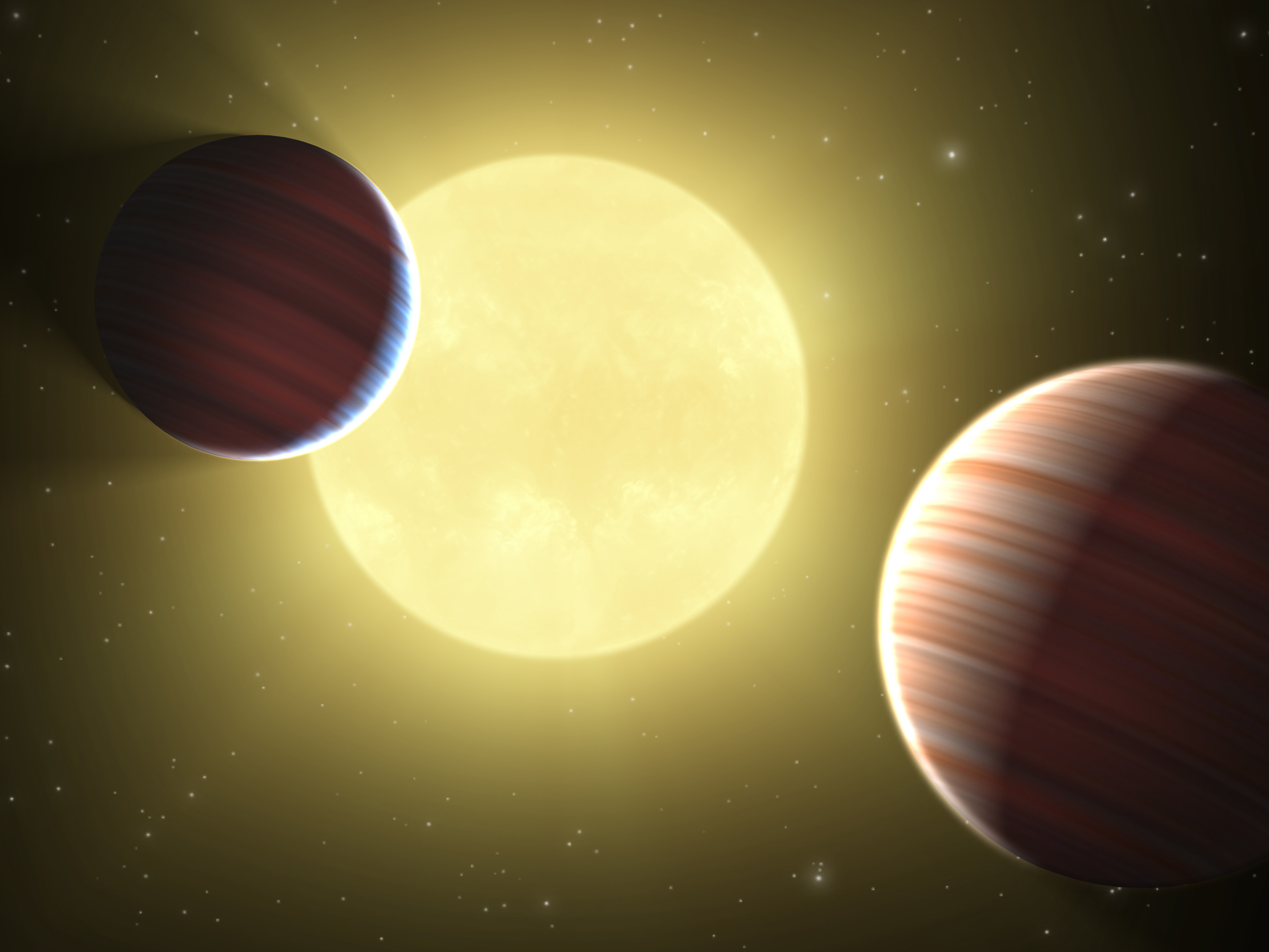
- An artist's impression of Kepler-9, including planets Kepler-9b and c

Observation data Epoch J2000 Equinox ICRS
- Constellation: Lyra
- Right ascension: 19^{h} 2^{m} 17.7544^{s}
- Declination: +38° 24′ 03.177″
- Apparent magnitude (V): 13.9

Astrometry
Proper motion (μ)	RA: 2.472(13) mas/yr Dec.: −14.691(15) mas/yr
Parallax (π)	1.5823±0.0120 mas
Distance	2,060 ± 20 ly (632 ± 5 pc)

Characteristics
- Evolutionary stage: main sequence
- Spectral type: G2V

Details
Mass	1.022+0.029 −0.039 M_{☉}
Radius	0.958±0.020 R_{☉}
Surface gravity (log g)	4.49+0.02 −0.03 cgs
Temperature	5774±60 K
Metallicity [Fe/H]	+0.05±0.07 dex
Rotation	16.746±0.077 days
Rotational velocity (v sin i)	2.74±0.40 km/s
Age	2.0+2.0 −1.3 Gyr

Other designations
- KOI-377, KIC 3323887, 2MASS J19021775+3824032

Database references
SIMBAD	data
Exoplanet Archive	data
KIC	data

Kepler-9 is a sunlike star in the constellation Lyra. Its planetary system, discovered by the Kepler Mission in 2010 was the first detected with the transit method found to contain multiple planets.

== Nomenclature and history ==
Kepler-9 was named for the Kepler Mission, a project headed by NASA that was designed to search for Earth-like planets.

In June 2010, some 43 days after Kepler came online, its operating scientists submitted a list of over 700 exoplanet candidates for review. Of those, five were originally suspected to have more than one planet. Kepler-9 was one of the multiplanetary systems; it was identified as such when scientists noticed significant variations in the time intervals at which Kepler-9 was transited. Kepler-9 holds the first multiplanetary system discovered using the transit method. It is also the first planetary system where transiting planets were confirmed through transit timing variations method, allowing to calculate the masses of planets. The discovery of the planets was announced on August 26, 2010.

== Characteristics ==
Kepler-9 is located in the constellation Lyra that lies some 632 parsecs away from Earth. With a mass of 1.07 M_{☉} and a radius of 1.02 R_{☉}, Kepler-9 is almost exactly the same size and width of the Sun, being only 7% more massive and 2% wider. Kepler-9 has an effective temperature of 5777 (± 61) K, as compared to the Sun's at 5778 K, and is approximately 32% more metal-rich (in terms of iron) than the Sun. Kepler-9 is younger than the Sun, and is estimated to be one billion years old.

== Planetary system ==
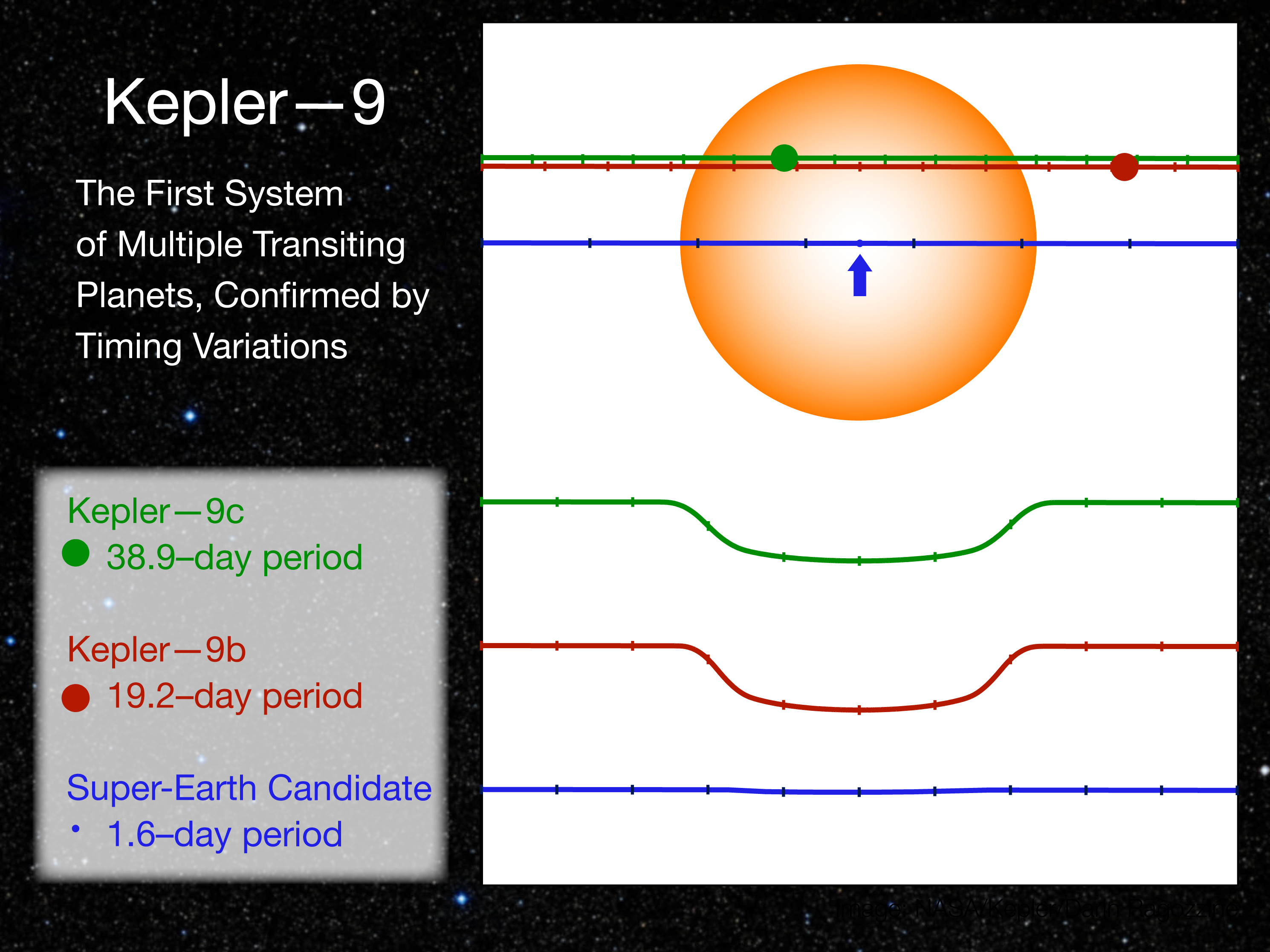
Light curves of the transiting planets of Kepler-9.

There are three confirmed planets, all in direct orbit. The outer two planets, Kepler-9b (the inner one) and Kepler-9c (the outer one), are low-density gas giants that are respectively 25% and 17% the mass of Jupiter and around 80% the radius of Jupiter. Both planets have a density less than that of water, similar to Saturn. The innermost planet, Kepler-9d, is a super-Earth with a radius that is 1.64 times that of Earth, orbiting the star every 1.6 days. It is estimated that there is a 0.59% chance that the discoveries are false.

From Kepler-9d (closest to star) to Kepler-9b (second from star), the ratio of their orbits is 1:12. However, the ratio of the orbits of the two outer planets is 1:2, a relationship known as a mean motion resonance. Kepler-9b and Kepler-9c are the first transiting planets detected in such an orbital configuration. The resonance causes the orbital speeds of each planet to change, and thus causes the transit times of the two planets to oscillate. The period of Kepler-9b is increasing by 4 minutes per orbit, while that of Kepler-9c is decreasing by 39 minutes per orbit. These orbital changes allowed the masses of the planets (a parameter not normally obtainable via the transit method) to be estimated using a dynamical model. The mass estimates were further refined using radial velocity measurements obtained with the HIRES instrument of the Keck 1 telescope.

Kepler-9b and 9c are thought to have formed beyond the "frost line". They are then thought to have migrated inward due to interactions with the remains of the protoplanetary disk. They would have been captured into orbital resonance during this migration.

In 2021, it was found the orbital plane of Kepler-9b and Kepler-9c are slowly changing, likely under the gravitational influence of the additional giant planet.

In 2026 a study called into question the transit timing variation mass determinations with only the mass ratio between the planets being reliable.

The Kepler-9 planetary system
Companion (in order from star)	Mass	Semimajor axis (AU)	Orbital period (days)	Eccentricity	Inclination (°)	Radius
d	—	0.02730+0.00042 −0.00043	1.592851±0.000045	0	—	1.64+0.19 −0.14 R_{🜨}
b	44.71±0.24 M_{🜨}	0.14276088±0.00000014	19.247	0.06378±0.00040	88.936±0.030	8.252±0.094 R_{🜨}
c	30.79±0.17 M_{🜨}	0.22889876±0.00000053	38.944	0.067990±0.000068	89.180±0.015	8.077±0.092 R_{🜨}

== See also ==
- List of extrasolar planets
- Kepler Mission
