= KOI-5 =

Triple star system in Cygnus

Observation data Epoch J2000 Equinox ICRS
- Constellation: Cygnus
- Right ascension: 19^{h} 18^{m} 57.5306^{s}
- Declination: +44° 38′ 50.619″
- Apparent magnitude (V): 11.78

Characteristics
- Spectral type: G2V

Astrometry
Radial velocity (R_{v})	−35.16 km/s
Proper motion (μ)	RA: +3.216 mas/yr Dec.: −10.925 mas/yr
Parallax (π)	1.7436±0.0666 mas
Distance	1,870 ± 70 ly (570 ± 20 pc)

Position (relative to KOI-5A)
Component	KOI-5B
Epoch of observation	2016
Angular distance	0.029±0.050″
Position angle	142.1±1.0°
Projected separation	16 AU

Position (relative to KOI-5A)
Component	KOI-5C
Epoch of observation	2016
Angular distance	0.141±0.050″
Position angle	304.3±2.2°
Projected separation	78 AU

Details

KOI-5A
Mass	1.13 M_{☉}
Radius	1.840±0.017 R_{☉}
Luminosity	3.86±0.17 L_{☉}
Surface gravity (log g)	4.19 cgs
Temperature	5861 K
Age	3.49±0.41 Gyr

KOI-5B
Mass	1.09 M_{☉}

Other designations
- TOI-1241, 2MASS J19185753+4438507, KIC 8554498, Gaia EDR3 2126945668448657664
- KOI-5A
- KOI-5B

Database references
SIMBAD	data

KOI-5 is a triple star system composed of three stars: KOI-5 A, KOI-5 B and KOI-5 C, orbiting 1,870±70 light-years away.

The two dim stellar companions to KOI-5A were discovered in 2016. KOI-5 A and B orbit each other every 29 years, and KOI-5 C orbits stars A and B every 400 years. KOI-5C is physically associated with the core stellar pair with probability 99.98%.

== Planetary system ==
Two planets orbiting one of KOI-5's stars were suspected since 2009 based on Kepler data, but KOI-5Ab was confirmed only in January 2021 after TESS determined the planet is orbiting KOI-5A. The exoplanet has caused interest in the scientific community because its orbital plane is misaligned with the closer star, suggesting it gave KOI-5Ab a gravitational kick during its development, resulting in the misalignment and inward migration to the current orbit. However, the confirmation of this planet has yet to be published in any peer-reviewed journal.

A second candidate planet was initially suspected, but was later found to be a false positive.

The KOI-5A planetary system
Companion (in order from star)	Mass	Semimajor axis (AU)	Orbital period (days)	Eccentricity	Inclination (°)	Radius
b	0.179 M_{J}	0.0596060	5	—	—	7.07 R_{🜨}
