= Kepler Follow-up Program =

The Kepler-Follow-up Program, known also as the Kepler Follow-up Observation Program and KFOP, is a program instituted to conduct follow-up observations on Kepler Objects of Interest (KOI), or signals noticed by the Kepler space telescope that may indicate the presence of a planet transiting its host star. Because using the transit method to find planets tends to also bring about a large number of false positives, KFOP is intended to rule out false positives amongst the KOIs and held confirm more of Kepler's targets.
