= Kepler-5b =

Extrasolar planet

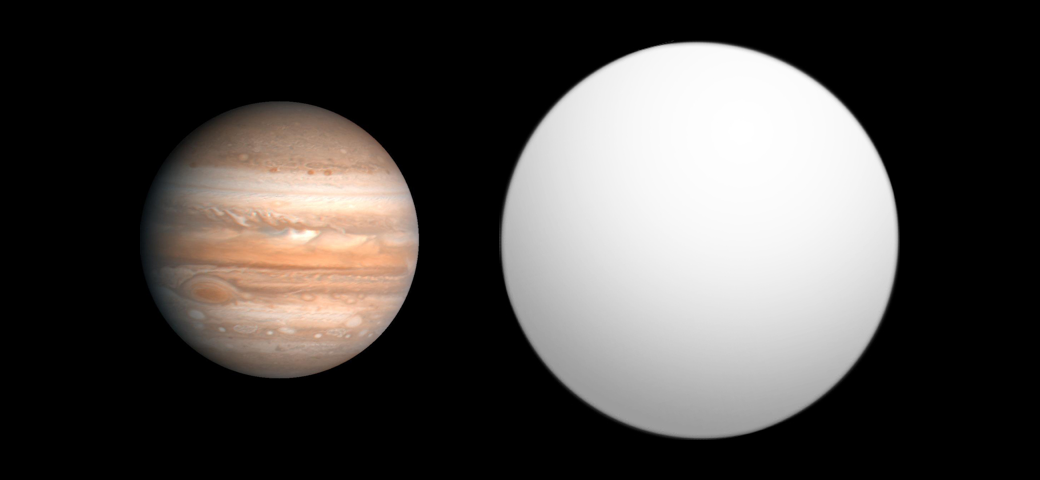
- Size comparison of Kepler-5b with Jupiter.

Discovery
- Discovery date: 2010-01-04
- Detection method: Transit (Kepler Mission)

Orbital characteristics
- Semi-major axis: 0.05064 ± 0.0007 AU (7,576,000 ± 105,000 km)
- Eccentricity: 0
- Orbital period (sidereal): 3.54846 ± 0.000032 d
- Inclination: 86.3 ± 0.6
- Star: Kepler-5

Physical characteristics
- Mean radius: 1.431 ± 0.048 R_{J} 15.5457 R_{🜨}
- Mass: 2.114 ± 0.064 M_{J}
- Albedo: 0.12±0.04
- Temperature: 2169^{+81｜}_{−113} K.

Kepler-5b is one of the first five planets discovered by NASA's Kepler spacecraft. It is a hot Jupiter that orbits a subgiant star that is more massive, larger, and more diffuse than the Sun is. Kepler-5 was first flagged as the location of a possibly transiting planet, and was reclassified as a Kepler Object of Interest until follow-up observations confirmed the planet's existence and many of its characteristics. The planet's discovery was announced at a meeting of the American Astronomical Society on January 4, 2010. The planet has approximately twice the mass of Jupiter, and is about 1.5 times larger. It is also fifteen times hotter than Jupiter. Kepler-5b orbits Kepler-5 every 3.5 days at a distance of approximately 0.051 AU (7.6 Gm).

== Observational history ==
The Kepler spacecraft's first days of science activity revealed a series of transit events, in which some body (such as a planet) crosses in front of, and therefore dims, its host star. Such objects were taken from the Kepler Input Catalog and reclassified as Kepler Objects of Interest. Kepler-5 was one of these objects of interest, and was given the designation KOI-18.

After the stellar parameters were established, the Kepler science team ran models and fits to ensure that Kepler-5's transit event was not a false positive, such as an eclipsing binary star. Once the planetary nature of Kepler-5b was established, the Kepler team searched for the planet's occultation behind its star, hoping to find the temperature on its day side. They found both, and were able to set the equilibrium temperature of the planet. The use of speckle imaging using adaptive optics at the WIYN Observatory in Arizona and the Palomar Observatory in California isolated the starlight of Kepler-5 from background stars.

Use of the Fibre-fed Echelle Spectrograph (FIES) at the Nordic Optical Telescope on the Canary Islands on June 4, 2009 provided data that was used to determine the star's stellar classification. The W.M. Keck Observatory's High Resolution Echelle Spectrometer (HIRES), which was used on June 3–6, 2009, and July 2–4, 2009, determined radial velocity measurements for the star, which helped to further define stellar parameters.

Kepler-5 has, as considered by the Kepler team, the potential for use in the study of planets in extreme conditions; its high temperature, large size, and short orbital period contribute to the aforementioned conditions. The findings of the Kepler team, which also included planets Kepler-4b, Kepler-6b, Kepler-7b, and Kepler-8b, were announced at the 215th meeting of the American Astronomical Society of January 4, 2010.

== Host star ==
Kepler-5 is a subgiant in the constellation Cygnus that is expected to soon deplete its hydrogen stores in the core and begin fusing hydrogen in the shell region surrounding the core. The star is 1.374 times the mass of the Sun (another model suggests that Kepler-5 as a mass of 1.21 times that of the Sun), although it is more diffuse at 1.793 times the Sun's radius. The star's metallicity is measured to be at [Fe/H] = 0.04, which means that Kepler-5 has 1.10 times the levels of iron as the Sun does.

The star's apparent magnitude is 13.4, meaning that it cannot be seen with the unaided eye.

== Characteristics ==
Kepler-5b is a hot Jupiter with a mass that is 2.114 times that of Jupiter and a radius of 1.431 times Jupiter's radius. This also means that Kepler-5b is not very dense. The planet's measured density is 0.894 grams/cm^{3}, less than that of pure water and comparable only to the density of Saturn, which is approximately 0.69 grams/cm^{3}. The planet has an equilibrium temperature of 1868 K, making it fifteen times hotter than Jupiter.

Kepler-5b orbits its host star every 3.5485 days at a mean distance of 0.05064 AU. In addition, with an orbital inclination of 86.3º, Kepler-5b orbits Kepler-5 almost edge-on with respect to Earth. In comparison, planet Mercury orbits the Sun at a distance of 0.387 AU every 87.97 days.

The planet is likely to be tidally locked to the parent star. In 2015, the planetary nightside temperature was estimated to be equal to 2169^{+81}_{−113} K.
