= Kepler-6b =

Extrasolar planet orbiting Kepler-6

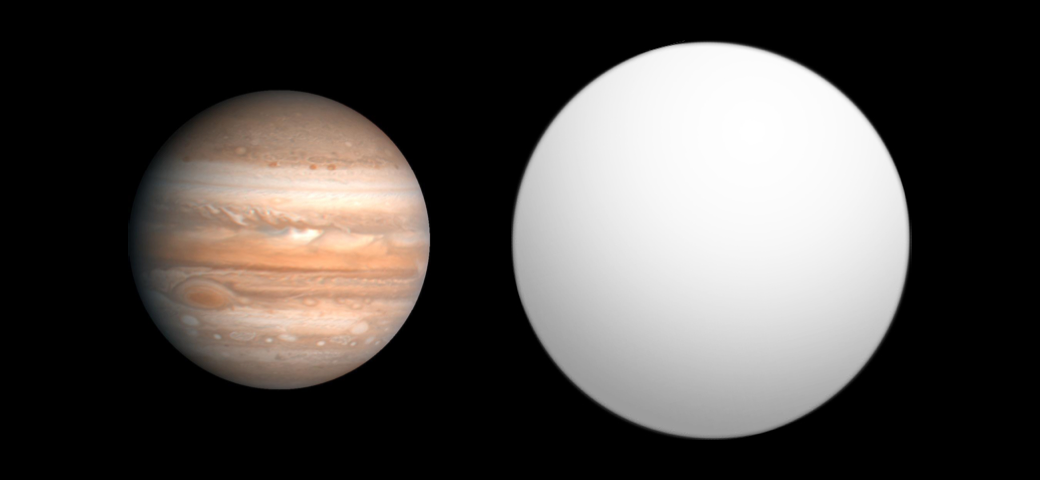
- Size comparison of Kepler-6b with Jupiter.

Discovery
- Discovery date: 2010-01-04
- Detection method: Transit (Kepler Mission)

Orbital characteristics
- Semi-major axis: 0.04567 ±0.00050 AU
- Eccentricity: 0
- Orbital period (sidereal): 3.234723 ± 0.000017 d
- Inclination: 86.8 ± 0.3
- Star: Kepler-6

Physical characteristics
- Mean radius: 1.323 ± 0.026 R_{J}
- Mass: 0.669 ± 0.027 M_{J}
- Mean density: 0.352 ± 0.019 g/cm^{3} (0.01272 ± 0.00069 lb/cu in)
- Albedo: 0.11±0.04
- Temperature: 1660 ± 100

Kepler-6b is an extrasolar planet in the orbit of the unusually metal-rich Kepler-6, a star in the field of view of the NASA-operated Kepler spacecraft, which searches for planets that cross directly in front of, or transit, their host stars. It was the third planet to be discovered by Kepler. Kepler-6 orbits its host star every three days from a distance of .046 AU. Its proximity to Kepler-6 inflated the planet, about two-thirds the mass of Jupiter, to slightly larger than Jupiter's size and greatly heated its atmosphere.

Follow-up observations led to the planet's confirmation, which was announced at a meeting of the American Astronomical Society on January 4, 2010 along with four other Kepler-discovered planets.

== Discovery and naming ==
NASA's Kepler satellite trails the Earth and continually observes a portion of the sky between the constellations Cygnus and Lyra. It is devised to search for and discover planets that transit, or cross in front of, their host stars with respect to Earth by measuring small and generally periodic variations in a star's brightness. Kepler recognized a potential transit event around a star that was designated KOI-017, which was named Kepler-6 after the confirmation of Kepler-6b. The star was designated "6" because it was the sixth planet to be observed (but the third planet to be discovered) by the Kepler satellite.

After the initial detection of a transit signal by Kepler, follow-up observations were taken to confirm the planetary nature of the candidate. Speckle imaging by the WIYN Telescope was used to determine the amount of light from nearby, background stars that was present. If not accounted for, this light would have made Kepler-6 appear brighter than it actually was. Consequently, the size of Kepler-6b would have been underestimated. Radial velocity data was taken by HIRES at the Keck I telescope in order to determine the mass of the planet. Independently, observations were made with the Spitzer Space Telescope at infrared wavelengths of 3.6 and 4.5 micrometres. Along with additional data taken by Kepler, these observations detected the occultation and phase curves of Kepler-6b behind its star.

The confirmation of Kepler-6b was announced at the 215th meeting of the American Astronomical Society with the discoveries of planets Kepler-4b, Kepler-5b, Kepler-7b, and Kepler-8b on January 4, 2010.

== Host star ==
Kepler-6 is a sunlike star in the Cygnus constellation. It is approximately 20.9% more massive than and 39.1% larger than the Sun. With an effective temperature of 5647 K, Kepler-6 is cooler than the Sun. It is predicted to be 3.8 billion years old, compared to the Sun's age of 4.6 billion years. It is most notable for its unusually high metallicity for an exoplanet-bearing star; with an [Fe/H] = 0.34, Kepler-6 has 2.18 times more iron than the Sun does. Kepler-6b is the only planet that has been discovered in the orbit of Kepler-6.

== Characteristics ==
Kepler-6b is a hot Jupiter, having a mass 0.669 times that of Jupiter, but an average distance of only 0.046 AU from its star and, thus, an orbital period of 3.23 days. It is almost 10 times closer to its star than Mercury is from the Sun. As a result, Kepler-6b is strongly irradiated by its star, heating its atmosphere to a temperature of 1660 K and puffing it up to a size 1.3 times that of Jupiter. It may also be the case that Kepler-6b has a thermal inversion of its atmosphere, where temperature increases with increasing distance from the center of the planet.

The planet is likely to be tidally locked to the parent star. In 2015, the planetary nightside temperature was estimated to be equal to 1719±236 K.
