= Kepler-4b =

Extrasolar planet in the constellation Draco

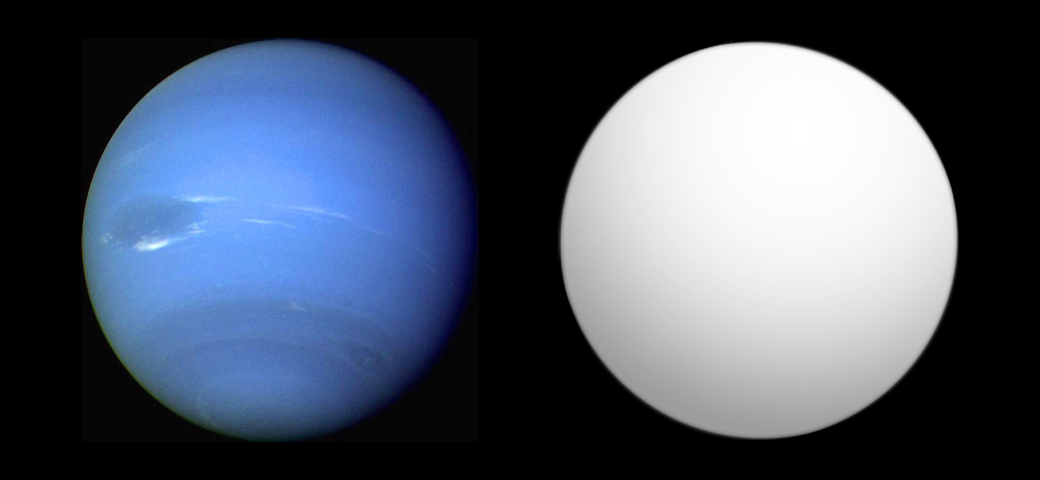
- Size comparison of Neptune (left) with Kepler-4b (right).

Discovery
- Discovery date: 2010-01-04
- Detection method: Transit (Kepler Mission)

Orbital characteristics
- Semi-major axis: 0.04558 AU (6,819,000 km)
- Eccentricity: 0.25 ± 0.12
- Orbital period (sidereal): 3.2135 d
- Inclination: 89.76
- Star: Kepler-4

Physical characteristics
- Mean radius: 0.357 R_{J}
- Mass: 0.077 M_{J}
- Temperature: 1650 k

Kepler-4b, initially known as KOI 7.01, is an extrasolar planet first detected as a transit by the Kepler spacecraft. Its radius and mass are similar to that of Neptune; however, due to its proximity to its host star, it is substantially hotter than any planet in the Solar System. The planet's discovery was announced on January 4, 2010, in Washington, D.C., along with four other planets that were initially detected by the Kepler spacecraft and subsequently confirmed by telescopes at the W.M. Keck Observatory.

== Nomenclature and history ==
Kepler-4b was named because it was the first planet discovered in the orbit of its star, Kepler-4. The star was, in turn, named for the Kepler Mission, a NASA satellite whose purpose is to discover Earth-like planets in a section of the sky between constellations Cygnus and Lyra using the transit method. Using this method, Kepler notes small and steady decreases in a star's brightness that are measured as a planet crosses in front of it. Initially, Kepler-4b was detected as a transit event by the Kepler telescope and considered a Kepler Object of Interest with the designation KOI 7.01.

Subsequent radial velocity measurements by the High Resolution Echelle Spectrometer on the telescopes of W.M. Keck Observatory confirmed the planetary nature of the transit event and established a mass estimate for the planet. The planet's discovery was announced on January 4, 2010, along with four other planets detected by Kepler: Kepler-5b, 6b, 7b and 8b at the 215th meeting of the American Astronomical Society in Washington, D.C.

== Host star ==
Kepler-4 is a star very similar to the sun located about 1610 light-years away from Earth, in the constellation of Draco.

== Characteristics ==
Kepler-4b orbits its host star in 3.213 days at a distance of 0.046 AU. This places it almost 10 times closer to its star than Mercury is to the Sun. Consequently, Kepler-4b is thought to be extremely hot, with an equilibrium temperature greater than 1700 kelvins (2600 °F). (1426°C) The planet is estimated to be 25 times more massive than the Earth with a radius that is 4 times greater than the Earth. This makes it similar to Neptune in terms of size and mass, but with a temperature that is not comparable to any planet in the Solar System (Venus, the hottest planet, is only 735 kelvins). Kepler-4b's eccentricity was assumed to be 0, however an independent reanalysis of the discovery data found a value of 0.25 ± 0.12, and a later reanalysis of the light curve discovered a secondary eclipse with depth 7.47 ± 1.82ppm at a phase of about 0.7.

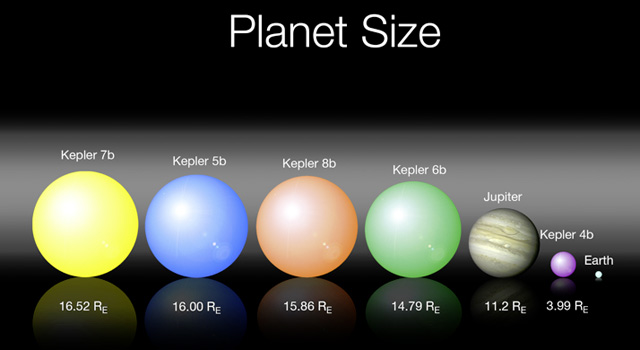
A picture showing the relative sizes of the first five planets discovered by Kepler. Kepler-4b is the smallest of the five, highlighted in purple.

== See also ==
- List of exoplanets discovered by the Kepler space telescope
