= Kepler-5 =

Star in the constellation Cygnus

Observation data Epoch J2000 Equinox ICRS
- Constellation: Cygnus
- Right ascension: 19^{h} 57^{m} 37.6885^{s}
- Declination: +44° 2′ 06.190″
- Apparent magnitude (V): 13.5

Characteristics
- Evolutionary stage: main sequence
- Spectral type: F5V
- Apparent magnitude (J): 12.115±0.029
- Apparent magnitude (H): 11.863±0.032
- Apparent magnitude (K): 11.769±0.025

Astrometry
Radial velocity (R_{v})	−19±2 km/s
Proper motion (μ)	RA: −0.190(13) mas/yr Dec.: −3.252(12) mas/yr
Parallax (π)	1.0829±0.0202 mas
Distance	3,010 ± 60 ly (920 ± 20 pc)

Details
Mass	1.3 M_{☉}
Radius	1.8 R_{☉}
Luminosity	4.2 L_{☉}
Surface gravity (log g)	4.01 cgs
Temperature	6,210 K
Metallicity [Fe/H]	−0.10 dex
Rotation	44.71 days
Rotational velocity (v sin i)	4.4 km/s
Age	3.3 Gyr

Other designations
- KOI-18, KIC 8191672, 2MASS J19573768+4402061

Database references
SIMBAD	data
KIC	data

Kepler-5 is a star located in the constellation Cygnus in the field of view of the Kepler Mission, a NASA project aimed at detecting planets in transit of, or passing in front of, their host stars as seen from Earth. One closely-orbiting, Jupiter-like planet, named Kepler-5b, has been detected around Kepler-5. Kepler-5's planet was one of the first five planets to be discovered by the Kepler spacecraft; its discovery was announced on January 4, 2010 at the 215th meeting of the American Astronomical Society after being verified by a variety of observatories. Kepler-5 is larger and more massive than the Sun, but has a similar metallicity, a major factor in planet formation.

== Nomenclature and history ==
Three discoveries made prior to the Kepler mission, which were in Kepler's field of view, were given the Kepler designations 1, 2 and 3. Kepler-5 is actually the second planet-bearing star discovered during the course of the Kepler Mission, a NASA operation that seeks to discover Earth-like planets that transit, or cross in front of, their host stars with respect to Earth. The star's planet, Kepler-5b, was therefore the second of the first five planets to be announced to the public on January 4, 2010 at the 215th meeting of the American Astronomical Society in Washington, D.C., along with planets around Kepler-4, Kepler-6, Kepler-7, and Kepler-8.

Kepler-5b's initial discovery by Kepler was re-examined by scientists at the W.M. Keck Observatory at Mauna Kea, Hawaii; the McDonald Observatory in west Texas; the Palomar and Lick Observatories in California; the MMT, WIYN, and Whipple Observatories in Arizona; and the Roque de los Muchachos Observatory in the Canary Islands.

== Characteristics ==
Kepler-5 is a sunlike star that is 1.374 (± 0.056) M_{sun} and 1.793 (± 0.053) R_{sun}, and is 137% the mass of and 179% the radius of the Sun. The star has a metallicity of [Fe/H] 0.04 (± 0.06), making it approximately as metal-rich as the Sun, therefore increasing the star's likelihood to have planets in orbit. Kepler-5 has an effective temperature of 6297 (± 60) K, which is hotter than the Sun's effective temperature of 5778 K. Kepler-5 has an apparent magnitude of 13.4, and cannot be seen with the naked eye.

== Companion stars ==
A recent catalog of companions to Kepler stars determined from high-resolution imaging shows two companions to Kepler-5 at distances of 0.9 and 3.5 arc seconds. Whether these stars are physically bound to Kepler-5 or merely chance alignments of unrelated stars is unknown however recent studies have shown that 60 to 80% of companions within 1 arc second of Kepler stars are true binaries.

== Planetary system ==
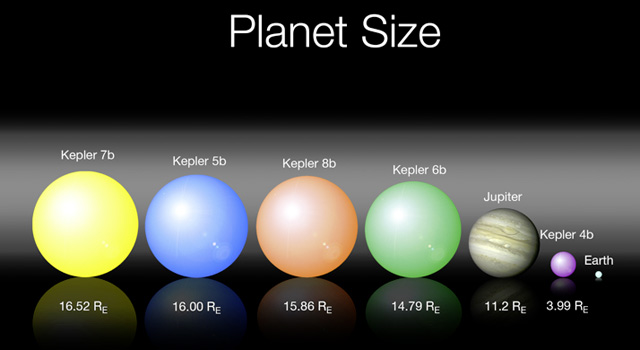
A picture showing the relative sizes of the first five planets discovered by Kepler. Kepler-5b is the second largest, highlighted in blue.

Kepler-5b is 2.111 M_{J} and 1.426 R_{J}. It is, thus, more than twice the mass of Jupiter, and slightly less than three halves of Jupiter's radius. Kepler-5b orbits its star every 3.5485 days, lying at approximately 0.0538 AU from Kepler-5. It is, thus, a Hot Jupiter, or a gas giant that orbits near to its host star. To compare, Mercury orbits the sun at .3871 AU every 87.97 days. The planet's eccentricity is assumed to be 0, which is the eccentricity for a circular orbit.

The Kepler-5 planetary system
Companion (in order from star)	Mass	Semimajor axis (AU)	Orbital period (days)	Eccentricity	Inclination (°)	Radius
b	2.111+0.067 −0.086 M_{J}	0.0538+0.0015 −0.0021	3.548465446 ± 1.83×10^{−07}	0	89.14+0.44 −0.32	1.426+0.036 −0.051 R_{J}

== See also ==
- List of extrasolar planets
- Kepler Mission
