= Kepler-7b =

Planet orbiting Kepler-7

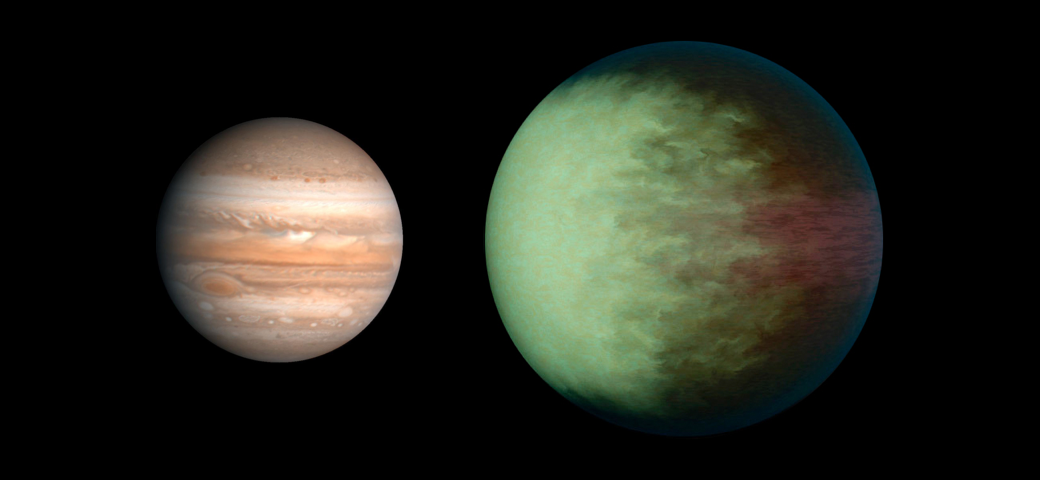
- Size comparison of Kepler-7b with Jupiter, showing a rudimentary map of its atmosphere derived from telescope observations

Discovery
- Discovery date: January 4, 2010
- Detection method: Transit (Kepler Mission)

Orbital characteristics
- Semi-major axis: 0.06224 AU
- Eccentricity: 0
- Orbital period (sidereal): 4.885525±0.000040 d
- Inclination: 86.5
- Star: Kepler-7

Physical characteristics
- Mean radius: 1.478+0.050 −0.051 R_{J}
- Mass: 0.433+0.040 −0.041 M_{J}
- Mean density: 0.166+0.019 −0.020 g/cm^{3}
- Albedo: 0.32±0.03
- Temperature: 1,540 K (1,270 °C; 2,310 °F)

Kepler-7b is one of the first five exoplanets to be confirmed by NASA's Kepler spacecraft, and was confirmed during the first 34 days of Kepler's science operations. It orbits a star slightly hotter and significantly larger than the Sun that is expected to soon reach the end of the main sequence. Kepler-7b is a hot Jupiter that is about half the mass of Jupiter, but is nearly 1.5 times its size; at the time of its discovery, Kepler-7b was the second most diffuse planet known, surpassed only by WASP-17b. It orbits its host star every five days at a distance of approximately 0.06 AU (9,000,000 km; 5,600,000 mi). Kepler-7b was announced at a meeting of the American Astronomical Society on January 4, 2010. It is the first extrasolar planet to have a crude map of cloud coverage.

== Characteristics ==
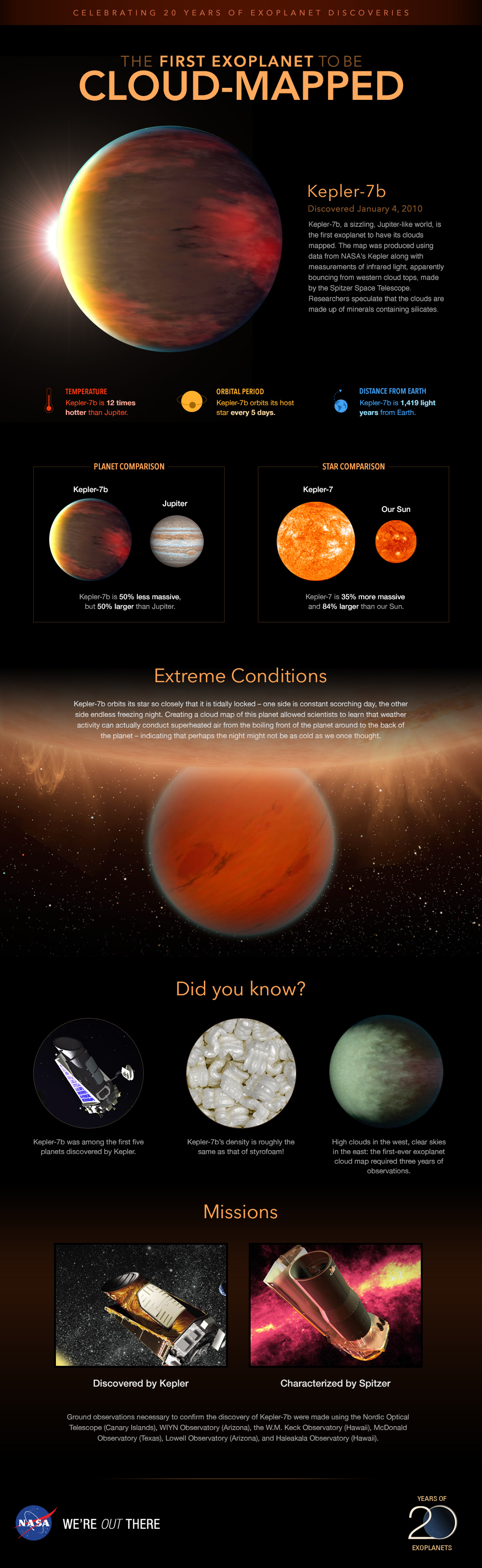
Profile of planet Kepler–7b by NASA

=== Mass, temperature, and orbit ===
Kepler-7b is a hot Jupiter, a Jupiter-like exoplanet orbiting close to its star. Its equilibrium temperature, due to its proximity to its star, is hot and is measured at nearly 1540 K. However, of the first five planets discovered by Kepler, it is the second coolest, being surpassed only by Kepler-6b. This is over twelve times hotter than Jupiter. Kepler-7b has a mass of only 0.433 that of Jupiter but due to proximity to its star the planet has expanded to a radius of 1.478 that of Jupiter. Because of this its mean density is only 0.166 g/cm^{3}, about the same as expanded polystyrene. Only WASP-17b (0.49M_{J}; 1.66R_{J}) was known to have a lower density at the time of Kepler-7b's discovery. Such low densities are not predicted by current standard theories of planet formation.

Kepler-7b orbits its host star every 4.8855 days at a distance of 0.06224 AU, making it the furthest-orbiting planet of the first five discovered by Kepler. Mercury, in contrast, orbits at a distance of 0.387 AU every 87.97 days. In addition Kepler-7b has an observed orbital inclination of 86.5º, which means that its orbit is almost edge-on as seen from Earth.

=== Cloud mapping ===
Astronomers using data from NASA's Kepler and Spitzer space telescopes have created a cloud map of the planet. It is the first cloud map to be created beyond the Solar System. Kepler's visible-light observations of Kepler-7b's Moon-like phases led to a rough map of the planet that showed a bright spot on its western hemisphere. But these data were not enough on their own to decipher whether the bright spot was coming from clouds or heat. The Spitzer Space Telescope played a crucial role in answering this question. Jonathan Fortney, professor of astronomy and astrophysics at UC Santa Cruz, said: "These clouds may well be composed of rock and iron, since the planet is over 1,000 degrees Fahrenheit (500 degrees Celsius)." Brice-Olivier Demory of the Massachusetts Institute of Technology noted that the oceans and continents cannot be detected, but a clear reflective signature has been detected which is interpreted as cloud. Thomas Barclay, Kepler scientist at NASA's Ames Research Center, said: "Unlike those on Earth, the cloud patterns on this planet do not seem to change much over time—it has a remarkably stable climate."

=== Host star ===
Kepler-7 is the largest host star of the first five planets detected by Kepler, and is situated in the constellation Lyra. The star has a radius 184% that of the Sun. Kepler-7 also has 135% the Sun's mass, and thus is larger and more massive (though less dense) than the Sun. It is slightly hotter than the Sun, as Kepler-7 has an effective temperature of 5933 K. The star is near the end of its life on the main sequence. The star's metallicity is [Fe/H] = 0.11, which means that Kepler-7 has 128% the amount of iron than is detected in the Sun.

== Discovery ==
Graph of the light curve taken with the Kepler Mission. The clear dip is where the light dims as Kepler-7b transits its star.

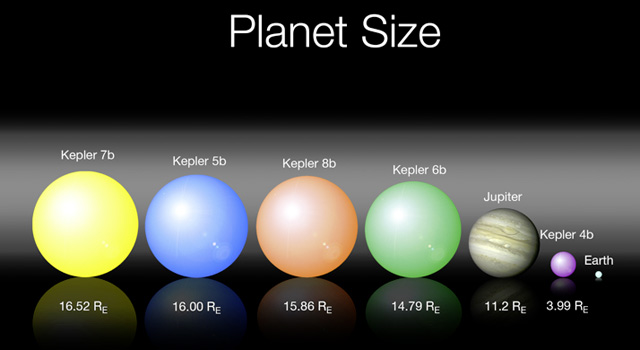
The sizes of Kepler's first five planet discoveries. Kepler-7b is the largest planet, and is shown in yellow at the left.

In 2009, NASA's Kepler space telescope was completing the last of tests on its photometer, the instrument it uses to detect transit events, in which a planet crosses in front of and dims its host star for a brief and roughly regular period of time. In this last test, Kepler observed 50000 stars in the Kepler Input Catalog, including Kepler-7; the preliminary light curves were sent to the Kepler science team for analysis, who chose obvious planetary companions from the bunch for follow-up at observatories. Kepler-7 was not one of these original candidates. After a resting period of 1.3 days, Kepler began a nonstop 33.5-day period in which it observed 150000 targets uninterrupted until June 15, 2009, when the collected data was downloaded and tested for false positives. Kepler-7's candidate was not found to be one of these false positives, such as an eclipsing binary star that may generate a light curve that mimics that of transiting planetary companions.

Kepler-7 was then observed using Doppler spectroscopy using the Fibre-fed Echelle Spectrograph at the Canary Islands' Nordic Optical Telescope for ten nights in October 2009, taken regards to the star HD 182488 to compensate for possible telescope error. Speckle imaging of the star was taken at WIYN Observatory in Arizona to check for close companions; when none were found, the High Resolution Echelle Spectrometer instrument at the W.M. Keck Observatory on Hawaii, the Harlan J. Smith Telescope at the McDonald Observatory in Texas, the PRISM camera at the Lowell Observatory, and the Faulkes Telescope North at the Haleakala Observatory on Maui were also used to analyze Doppler spectroscopy of the planetary candidate.

The radial velocity observations confirmed that a planetary body was responsible for the dips observed in Kepler-7's light curve, thus confirming it as a planet. Kepler's first discoveries, including the planets Kepler-4b, Kepler-5b, Kepler-6b, Kepler-7b, and Kepler-8b, were first announced on January 4, 2010, at the 215th meeting of the American Astronomical Society in Washington, D.C. In May 2011, the planet was detected by brightness variations of the star cause by reflected starlight from the planet. It was found that Kepler-7b has a relatively high geometric albedo of 0.3.
