= Kepler-7 =

G-type star located in the constellation Lyra

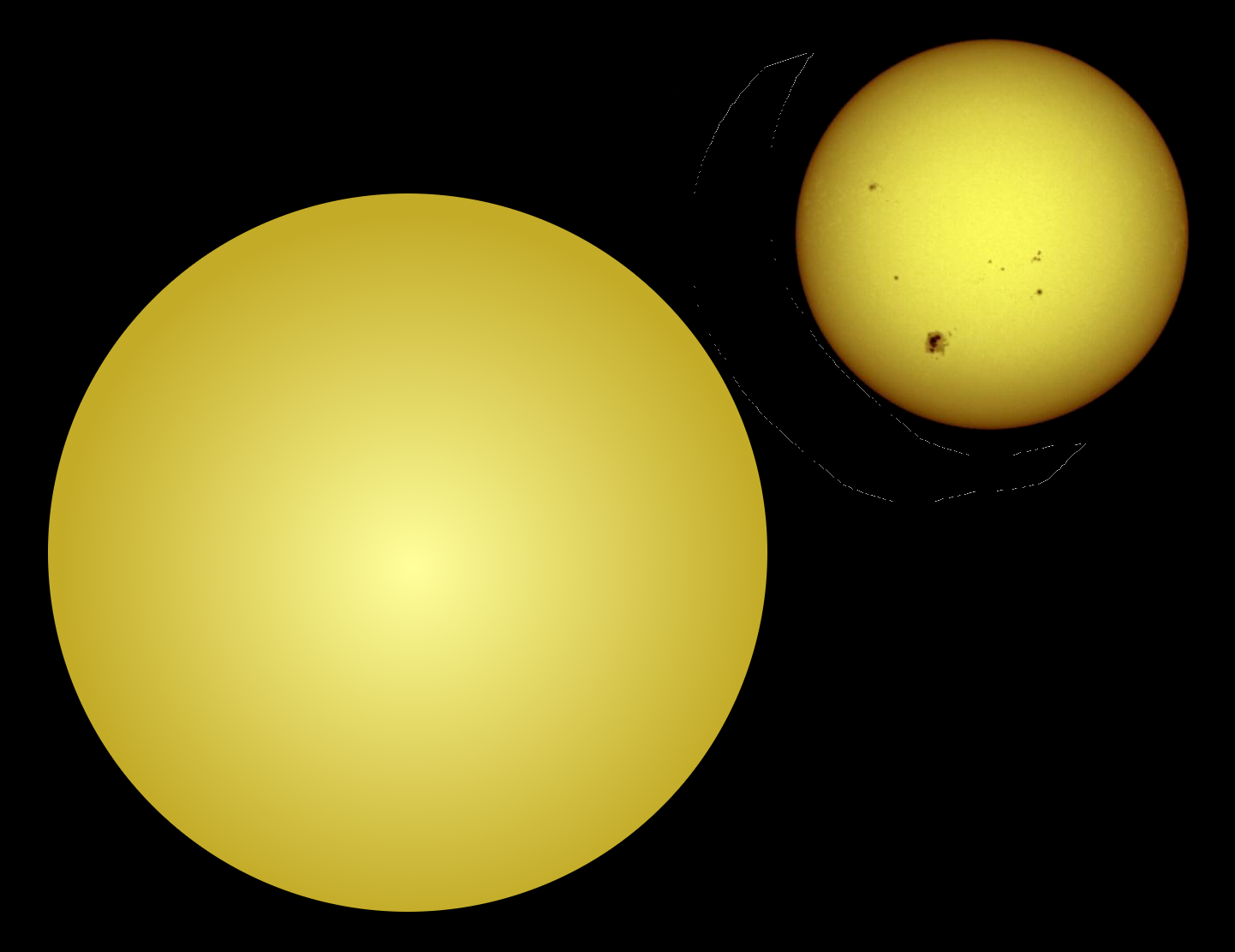
- Kepler-7-Sun comparison

Observation data Epoch J2000 Equinox J2000
- Constellation: Lyra
- Right ascension: 19^{h} 14^{m} 19.5623^{s}
- Declination: +41° 05′ 23.367″
- Apparent magnitude (V): 13.005±0.039

Characteristics
- Evolutionary stage: main sequence
- Spectral type: G0
- Apparent magnitude (J): 11.833±0.020
- Apparent magnitude (H): 11.601±0.022
- Apparent magnitude (K): 11.535±0.020
- Apparent magnitude (B): 13.620±0.029

Astrometry
Radial velocity (R_{v})	+0.40 ± 0.10 km/s
Proper motion (μ)	RA: −2.937(15) mas/yr Dec.: −21.084(14) mas/yr
Parallax (π)	1.0319±0.0121 mas
Distance	3,160 ± 40 ly (970 ± 10 pc)

Details
Mass	1.347+0.072 −0.054 M_{☉}
Radius	1.843+0.048 −0.066 R_{☉}
Luminosity	4.15+0.63 −0.54 L_{☉}
Surface gravity (log g)	3.98 ± 0.10 cgs
Temperature	5933 ± 44 K
Metallicity [Fe/H]	+0.11 ± 0.03 dex
Rotational velocity (v sin i)	4.2 ± 0.5 km/s
Age	3.3 ± 0.4 Gyr

Other designations
- WDS J19143+4105AB, KOI-97, KIC 5780885, 2MASS J19141956+4105233

Database references
SIMBAD	data

Kepler-7 is a star located in the constellation Lyra in the field of view of the Kepler Mission, a NASA operation in search of Earth-like planets. It is home to the fourth of the first five planets that Kepler discovered; this planet, a Jupiter-size gas giant named Kepler-7b, is as light as styrofoam. The star itself is more massive than the Sun, and is nearly twice the Sun's radius. It is also slightly metal-rich, a major factor in the formation of planetary systems. Kepler-7's planet was presented on January 4, 2010 at a meeting of the American Astronomical Society.

== Nomenclature and discovery ==
Kepler-7 received its name because it was the home to the seventh planetary system discovered by the NASA-led Kepler Mission, a project aimed at detecting terrestrial planets that transit, or pass in front of, their host stars as seen from Earth. The planet orbiting Kepler-7 was the fourth planet to be discovered by the Kepler spacecraft; the first three planets combed from Kepler's data had been previously discovered, and were used to verify the accuracy of Kepler's measurements. Kepler-7b was announced to the public on January 4, 2010 at the 215th meeting of the American Astronomical Society in Washington, D.C. along with Kepler-4b, Kepler-5b, Kepler-6b, and Kepler-8b. Kepler-7b was noted for its unusually and extremely low density.

The planet's initial discovery by Kepler was verified by additional observations made at observatories in Hawaii, Texas, Arizona, California, and the Canary Islands.

== Characteristics ==
Kepler-7 is a sunlike star that is 1.347 M_{sun} and 1.843 R_{sun}. This means that the star is about 35% more massive and 84% wider than the Sun. The star is estimated to be 3.5 (± 1) billion years old. It is also estimated to have a metallicity of [Fe/H] = 0.11 (± 0.03), meaning that Kepler-7 is approximately 30% more metal-rich than the Sun; metallicity plays a significant role in the formation of planetary systems, as metal-rich stars tend to be more likely to have planets in orbit. The star's effective temperature is 5933 (± 44) K. In comparison, the 4.6 billion-year-old Sun releases less heat, with an effective temperature of 5778 K.

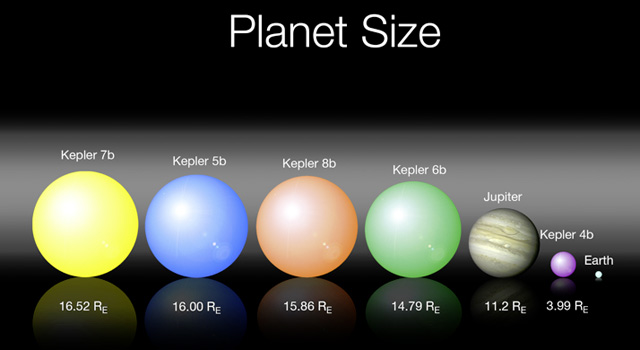
A picture showing the relative sizes of the first five planets discovered by Kepler. Kepler-7b is the largest, highlighted in yellow.

The star has a visual apparent magnitude of 13, meaning that it is extremely dim as seen from Earth. It cannot be seen with the naked eye. It is estimated to lie at approximately 3160 light years from the Solar System.

There is a star that is 4 magnitudes dimmer located 1.90 arcseconds away, whether this a gravitationally bound companion star or a chance optical alignment is unknown.

== Planetary system ==
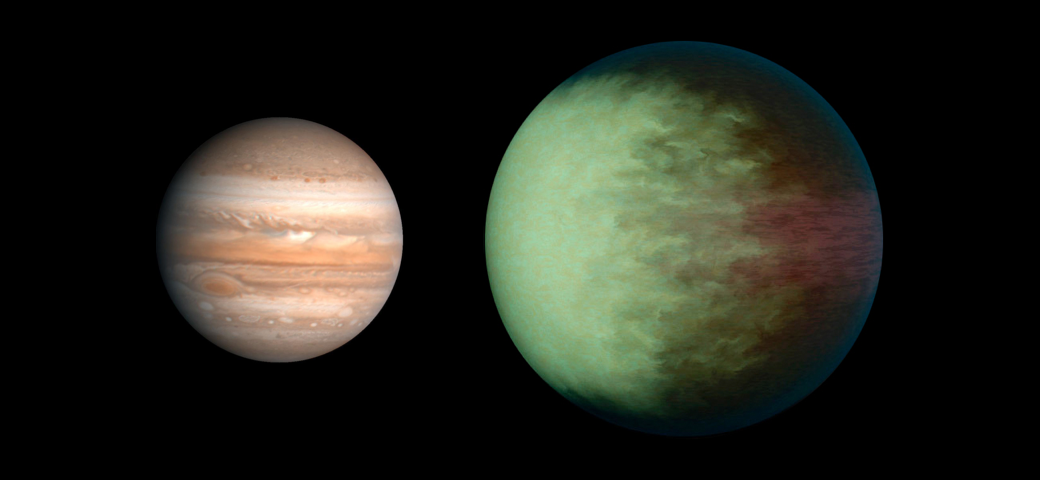
Kepler-7b compared to Jupiter. The rendering of the planet is represented by observations of the planet's upper atmosphere by the Spitzer Space Telescope.

Kepler-7b is the only planet that has been discovered in Kepler-7's orbit. It is 0.433 M_{J} and 1.478 R_{J}, meaning it is 43% the mass of planet Jupiter, but is nearly three halves its size. With a density of 0.166 g/cm^{3}, the planet is approximately 17% the density of water at room temperature. This is comparable to styrofoam. At a distance of 0.06224 AU from its host star, Kepler-7b completes an orbit around Kepler-7 every 4.8855 days. Planet Mercury, for comparison, orbits the Sun at 0.3871 AU, and takes approximately 87.97 days to complete one orbit. Kepler-7b's eccentricity is assumed to be 0, which would give Kepler-7b a circular orbit by definition.

The Kepler-7 planetary system
Companion (in order from star)	Mass	Semimajor axis (AU)	Orbital period (days)	Eccentricity	Inclination	Radius
b	0.433 M_{J}	0.06224	4.8855	0	—	1.478 R_{J}

== See also ==
- List of extrasolar planets
