= Kepler-296c =

Extrasolar planet

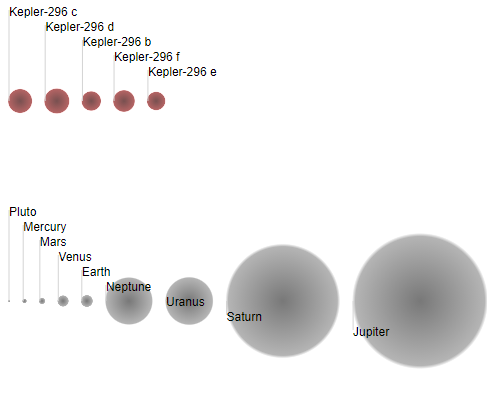
- The approximate sizes of the planets in this system compared to planets in the Solar System.

Discovery
- Discovered by: Kepler space telescope
- Discovery date: 2014
- Detection method: Transit photometry

Designations
- Alternative names: Kepler-296 Ac

Orbital characteristics
- Semi-major axis: 0.052±0.013
- Orbital period (sidereal): 5.84+0.0001 −0.0000

Physical characteristics
- Mean radius: 0.18±0.3 R_{J}

Kepler-296c is a confirmed exoplanet located in the binary star system Kepler-296. It was discovered in 2014 by the Kepler space telescope using the transit method. During a study by members of the NASA Ames Research Center on two other planets in the Kepler-296 system, Kepler-296f and Kepler-296e, they confirmed that Kepler-296c was an exoplanet with "more than 99% confidence".
