= Kepler-296b =

S-type exoplanet in Kepler-296

Discovery
- Discovery date: 2014
- Detection method: Transit

Orbital characteristics
- Semi-major axis: 0.079±0.013 AU
- Eccentricity: < 0.33
- Orbital period (sidereal): 10.8644+0.0001 −0.0000

Physical characteristics
- Mean radius: 1.6±0.3 R_{🜨} (0.14+0.03 −0.02 R_{J})
- Mass: 3.22 M_{🜨}

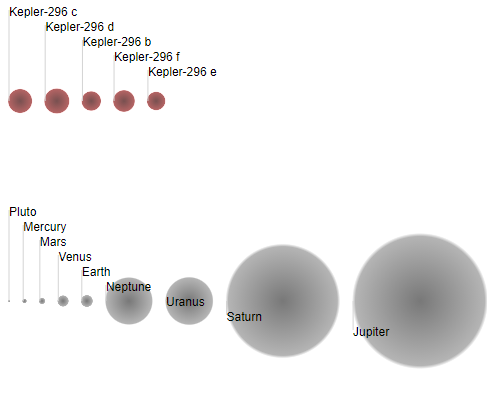
The following plot shows the approximate sizes of the planets in this system compared to planets in the Solar System.

Kepler-296b is an s-type exoplanet located in the binary star system Kepler-296. All 5 planets in this system orbit around the primary star.

It has been classed as a hot superterran.

It was discovered by the Kepler space telescope in 2014 using the transit method and was originally classed as a planet candidate, but during a study by members of the NASA Ames Research Center on two other planets in the Kepler-296 system, Kepler-296f and Kepler-296e, they were able to confirm that Kepler-296b is an exoplanet with "more than 99% confidence".

== Data ==
As with most other exoplanets, not many parameters are known about Kepler-296b. The few that are, are listed in the infobox to the right.
