= KOI-74 =

Binary star in the constellation Cygnus

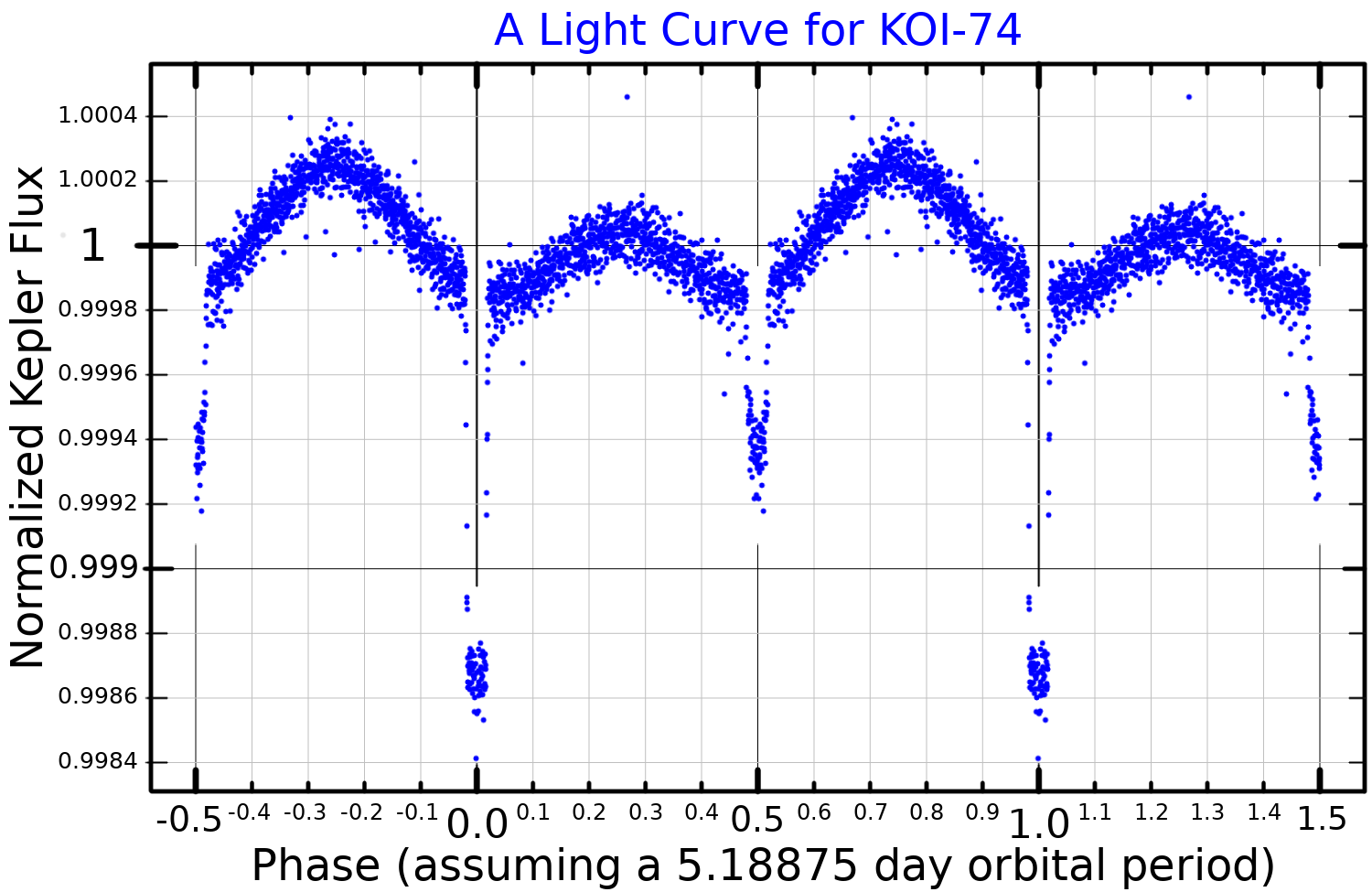
- A light curve for KOI-74, adapted from van Kerkwijk et al. (2010)

Observation data Epoch J2000 Equinox ICRS
- Constellation: Cygnus
- Right ascension: 19^{h} 53^{m} 17.810^{s}
- Declination: +42° 23′ 18.51″
- Apparent magnitude (V): 10.715

Characteristics
- Evolutionary stage: main sequence
- Spectral type: A1V
- B−V color index: 0.154

Astrometry
Radial velocity (R_{v})	−41.97±0.32 km/s
Proper motion (μ)	RA: +1.328 mas/yr Dec.: −41.497 mas/yr
Parallax (π)	1.328±0.144 mas
Distance	approx. 2,500 ly (approx. 750 pc)

Orbit
Period (P)	5.18875 days
Eccentricity (e)	0
Inclination (i)	88.8°
Semi-amplitude (K_{1}) (primary)	14.7 km/s

Details

primary
Mass	2.22^{+0.10}_{−0.14} M_{☉}
Radius	1.90^{+0.04}_{−0.05} R_{☉}
Luminosity	25.6±2.4 L_{☉}
Temperature	9,400±150 K

white dwarf
Mass	0.22±0.01 M_{☉}
Radius	0.043±0.004 R_{☉}
Luminosity	0.05±0.02 L_{☉}
Temperature	13,000±1,000 K

Other designations
- KIC 6889235, 2MASS J19531781+4223185, GSC2.3 N2J3000844

Database references
SIMBAD	data
KIC	data

KOI-74 (KIC 6889235) is an eclipsing binary star in the constellation of Cygnus. The primary star is an A-type main-sequence star with a temperature of 9,400 K (9,130 °C; 16,460 °F). It lies in the field of view of the Kepler Mission and was determined to have a companion object in orbit around it which is smaller and hotter than the main star.

== KOI-74b ==
KOI-74b is a hot compact object orbiting KOI-74. It was discovered in 2010 by the Kepler Mission and came to attention because of its small size (its radius is only 4.3% of the solar radius) and high temperature of 13,000 K (12,700 °C; 22,900 °F). The orbit of KOI-74b around the main star takes 5.18875 days to complete. Analysis of relativistic boosting of light in the Kepler data indicates that it is likely to be a low mass white dwarf of approximately 0.22 solar masses, resulting from an earlier phase of mass transfer in a binary system when the object underwent its giant phase.

== See also ==
- KOI-81, a similar system also discovered by the Kepler Mission.
- Kepler Object of Interest, stars observed to have transits by the Kepler Mission
