= Kepler-737 =

Red dwarf star in Cygnus

Observation data Epoch J2000 Equinox ICRS
- Constellation: Cygnus
- Right ascension: 19^{h} 27^{m} 27.085^{s}
- Declination: +46° 25′ 45.29″

Characteristics
- Evolutionary stage: main-sequence
- Spectral type: M0V
- Apparent magnitude (G): 15.127694
- Apparent magnitude (J): 12.910
- Apparent magnitude (H): 12.293
- Apparent magnitude (K): 12.097
- Apparent magnitude (B): 17.861
- Apparent magnitude (V): 15.971
- Apparent magnitude (W): 11.969

Astrometry
Proper motion (μ)	RA: 20.094 mas/yr Dec.: −19.889 mas/yr
Parallax (π)	4.8590±0.0194 mas
Distance	671 ± 3 ly (205.8 ± 0.8 pc)

Details
Luminosity	~0.045 L_{☉}
Surface gravity (log g)	4.722±0.008 cgs
Temperature	3,813^{+40.127}_{−38.492} K
Metallicity [Fe/H]	−0.24+0.087 −0.081 dex
Age	3.89 Gyr

Other designations
- KOI-947, KIC 9710326, TIC 63068329, 2MASS J19272708+4625453, WISE J192727.10+462545.1, Gaia DR2 2126820324123177472

Database references
SIMBAD	data

Kepler-737 is an M-type main-sequence red dwarf located 671 light-years away on the border of the constellation Cygnus.

== Physical properties ==
=== General properties ===
Kepler-737's spectral class is M0V, its temperature is about 3,813 Kelvin, and it has a brightness of 0.045 solar luminosity. One Kepler Object of Interest (KOI) table claimed the star to be ~14 billion years old.

As for the logarithm of the relative abundance of iron and hydrogen, its metallicity [Fe/H] is −0.24+0.087
−0.081 dex, significantly lower than the Sun's. Its density is roughly 5.239±0.265 g/cm^{3}, or about 3 times denser than the Sun; while its surface gravity is stronger than the Sun, with log g of 4.722±0.008 cgs.

=== Astrometry and characteristics ===
SIMBAD data indicate that its proper motion is 20.094 mas/yr for right ascension, −19.889 mas/yr for declination, its parallax is 4.859 mas.

== Planetary system ==
The star has one known planet, Kepler-737b.

The Kepler-737 planetary system
Companion (in order from star)	Mass	Semimajor axis (AU)	Orbital period (days)	Eccentricity	Inclination (°)	Radius
b	~4.5 M_{🜨}	0.035	28.592	0	89.99	1.96±0.11 R_{🜨}

Kepler-737b was confirmed on May 18, 2016 from data collected earlier by the Kepler space telescope, notable for orbiting in the habitable zone but not likely to be habitable because it is tidally locked. It may, however, have atmospheric circulation that would distribute the heat around the planet, potentially making a large portion of it habitable, although given its stellar flux the most likely scenario is that the planet's surface is too hot to be habitable. Water on its surface could also distribute heat.

On the note of the Exoplanet Archive, Kepler-737b was dedicated that orbital period, transit mid-point, transit duration, Rp/Rs, and their errors are taken from DR24 KOI table.
