= HAT-P-7 =

Star system in Cygnus

Observation data Epoch J2000 Equinox ICRS
- Constellation: Cygnus
- Right ascension: 19^{h} 28^{m} 59.3539^{s}
- Declination: +47° 58′ 10.217″
- Apparent magnitude (V): 10.46

Characteristics

A
- Evolutionary stage: Subgiant
- Spectral type: F5IV
- Apparent magnitude (B): ~10.90
- Apparent magnitude (V): ~10.46
- Apparent magnitude (J): 9.555 ± 0.030
- Apparent magnitude (H): 9.344 ± 0.029
- Apparent magnitude (K): 9.334 ± 0.018
- Variable type: planetary transit

B
- Evolutionary stage: Main sequence
- Spectral type: M5.5V

Astrometry
Radial velocity (R_{v})	−10.23±0.25 km/s
Proper motion (μ)	RA: −18.325(14) mas/yr Dec.: 8.851(14) mas/yr
Parallax (π)	2.9991±0.0114 mas
Distance	1,088 ± 4 ly (333 ± 1 pc)

Orbit
Primary	A
Secondary	B
Semi-major axis (a)	730 AU

Orbit
Primary	A
Secondary	C
Semi-major axis (a)	32+16 −11 AU
Eccentricity (e)	0.76+0.12 −0.26

Details

A
Mass	1.35±0.22 M_{☉}
Radius	1.994±0.081 R_{☉}
Surface gravity (log g)	3.97±0.08 cgs
Temperature	6,532±109 K
Metallicity [Fe/H]	0.15±0.08 dex
Rotational velocity (v sin i)	5.0±1.2 km/s

B
Mass	0.21 M_{☉}

C
Mass	0.19 M_{☉}

Other designations
- HAT-P-7, BD+47°2846, Kepler-2, KOI-2, KIC 10666592, TOI-1265, TIC 424865156, TYC 3547-1402-1, GSC 03547-01402, 2MASS J19285935+4758102

Database references
SIMBAD	data
Exoplanet Archive	data

HAT-P-7 is a triple star system located about 1088 light-years away in the constellation Cygnus. The apparent magnitude of this star is 10.5, which means it is not visible to the naked eye but can be seen with a small telescope on a clear dark night.

== Stellar system ==
The primary component of the HAT-P-7 system is an F-type main-sequence star with around 1.51 times the Sun's mass and twice the Sun's radius, hosting one known planet. The secondary is a red dwarf located 730 astronomical units away from the primary, with a spectral type of M5.5V and a mass of 0.21 M_{☉}. The tertiary is also a red dwarf with a mass of at least 0.15 M_{☉}; it is in a highly-eccentric orbit with a semi-major axis of 32 AU.

The secondary star, component B, was discovered in 2012. Another companion (in addition to the second star and the planet) was suspected based on long-period radial velocity variations, but its nature was unknown until 2025, when it was found to be a third star.

Component B has also been referred to as HAT-P-7 East. HAT-P-7 West is another candidate companion, of spectral type M9V or L0V, but it is not confirmed to be associated with the system and is likely an unrelated background star.

== Planetary system ==
The primary star has one known planet, HAT-P-7b, a hot Jupiter discovered in 2008. This star system was within the initial field of view of the Kepler planet-hunting spacecraft and was given the designation KOI-2 and later Kepler-2.

The HAT-P-7 planetary system
Companion (in order from star)	Mass	Semimajor axis (AU)	Orbital period (days)	Eccentricity	Inclination (°)	Radius
b	1.806±0.036 M_{J}	0.03813±0.00036	2.20473539167(1654)	<0.0040	83.151+0.030 −0.033	1.51±0.02 R_{J}

== See also ==
- HATNet Project
- Kepler Mission
