= Kepler-186 =

Star in the constellation Cygnus

- Kepler-186 is indicated by the red circle (2MASS J band image)

Observation data Epoch J2000.0 Equinox ICRS
- Constellation: Cygnus
- Right ascension: 19^{h} 54^{m} 36.6535^{s}
- Declination: +43° 57′ 18.026″
- Apparent magnitude (V): 15.29

Characteristics
- Evolutionary stage: Main sequence
- Spectral type: M1V

Astrometry
Proper motion (μ)	RA: 2.171(18) mas/yr Dec.: −4.363(20) mas/yr
Parallax (π)	5.6336±0.0169 mas
Distance	579 ± 2 ly (177.5 ± 0.5 pc)

Details
Mass	0.544 ± 0.02 M_{☉}
Radius	0.523 ± 0.02 R_{☉}
Luminosity (bolometric)	0.055 ^{+0.011}_{−0.006} L_{☉}
Habitable zone inner limit	0.22 au
Habitable zone outer limit	0.40 au
Temperature	3755 ± 90 K
Metallicity [Fe/H]	−0.26 ± 0.12 dex
Rotation	34.404±0.075 days
Age	4.0 ± 0.6 Gyr

Other designations
- KIC 8120608, KOI-571, 2MASS J19543665+4357180, Gaia DR2 2079000330051813504

Database references
SIMBAD	data
Exoplanet Archive	data

Kepler-186 is a red dwarf star, located 177.5 parsecs (579 light years) away in the constellation of Cygnus. The star is slightly cooler than the Sun, with roughly half its metallicity. It is known to have five planets, including the first Earth-sized planet discovered in the habitable zone: Kepler-186f. The star hosts four other planets discovered so far, though they all orbit interior to the habitable zone.

Within two first years of gathered data, the signals of four inner planetary candidates were found. Discussion of planets in the system was taking place in August and November 2013. In February 2014, those planets were confirmed through the "verification by multiplicity" method. The fifth outermost candidate was confirmed in the same manner in April 2014. The possibility that the signals in the light curve of the star were actually from something else has been ruled out by an investigation with the W. M. Keck and Gemini Observatories, using speckle imaging and adaptive optics techniques, which, while unable to resolve the planets, were able to rule out other possibilities than the system of planets.

== Naming ==
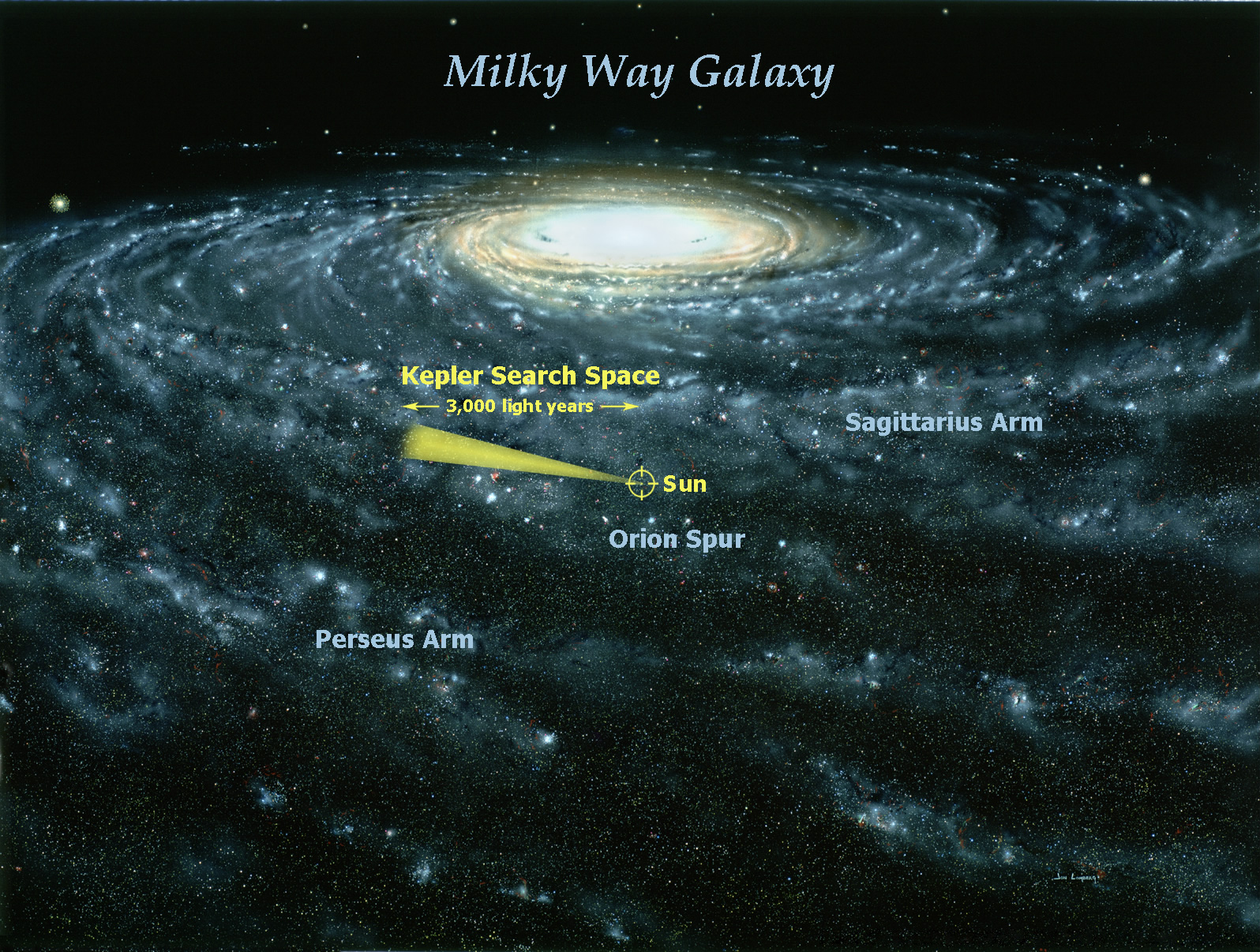
The Kepler Space Telescope search volume, in the context of the Milky Way Galaxy.

=== Kepler project ===
As the Kepler space telescope observational campaign progressed initial identifications of systems were entered in the Kepler Input Catalog (KIC), and then progressed as a candidate host of planets as Kepler Object of Interest (KOI). Thus Kepler-186 started as KIC 8120608 and then was identified as KOI 571. Planetary candidates were detected around the star by NASA's Kepler Mission, a mission tasked with discovering planets in transit around their stars. The transit method that Kepler uses involves detecting dips in brightness in stars. These dips in brightness can be interpreted as planets whose orbits pass in front of their stars from the perspective of Earth, although other phenomena can also be responsible which is why the term planetary candidate is used.

=== Outside the Kepler project ===
Outside of the Kepler project, the 2MASS survey catalogued this star as 2MASS J19543665+4357180.

== Star ==
A number of previously unknown measurements of the star are known. In the infrared/microwave EM spectrum its H band magnitude is 11.605, J band magnitude is 12.473, and its K band magnitude is 11.605. In the visual Photometric system magnitude it is 14.90(R)(towards the red end of the visual spectrum) and 16.40(B)(the blue end of the spectrum) (see also Apparent magnitude.) It is a BY Draconis variable changing brightness slightly, probably from star-spots, with a period of 33.695 days.

The star is an M-type red dwarf, bordering on being a K-type orange dwarf, with a mass 0.544 times that of the Sun's and a density of 5.29 g/cm^{3}.

== Planetary system ==
The Kepler-186 planetary system
Companion (in order from star)	Mass	Semimajor axis (AU)	Orbital period (days)	Eccentricity	Inclination (°)	Radius
b	~1.24 M_{🜨}	0.0343±0.0046	3.8867907	<0.24	83.56	1.07±0.12 R_{🜨}
c	~2.1 M_{🜨}	0.0451±0.0070	7.267302	<0.24	85.94	1.25±0.14 R_{🜨}
d	~2.54 M_{🜨}	0.0781±0.0010	13.342996	<0.25	87.09	1.4±0.16 R_{🜨}
e	~2.15 M_{🜨}	0.11±0.015	22.407704	<0.24	88.24	1.27±0.15 R_{🜨}
f	1.44+2.33 −1.12 M_{🜨}	0.432±0.01	129.9444	<0.04	89.9	1.17±0.08 R_{🜨}

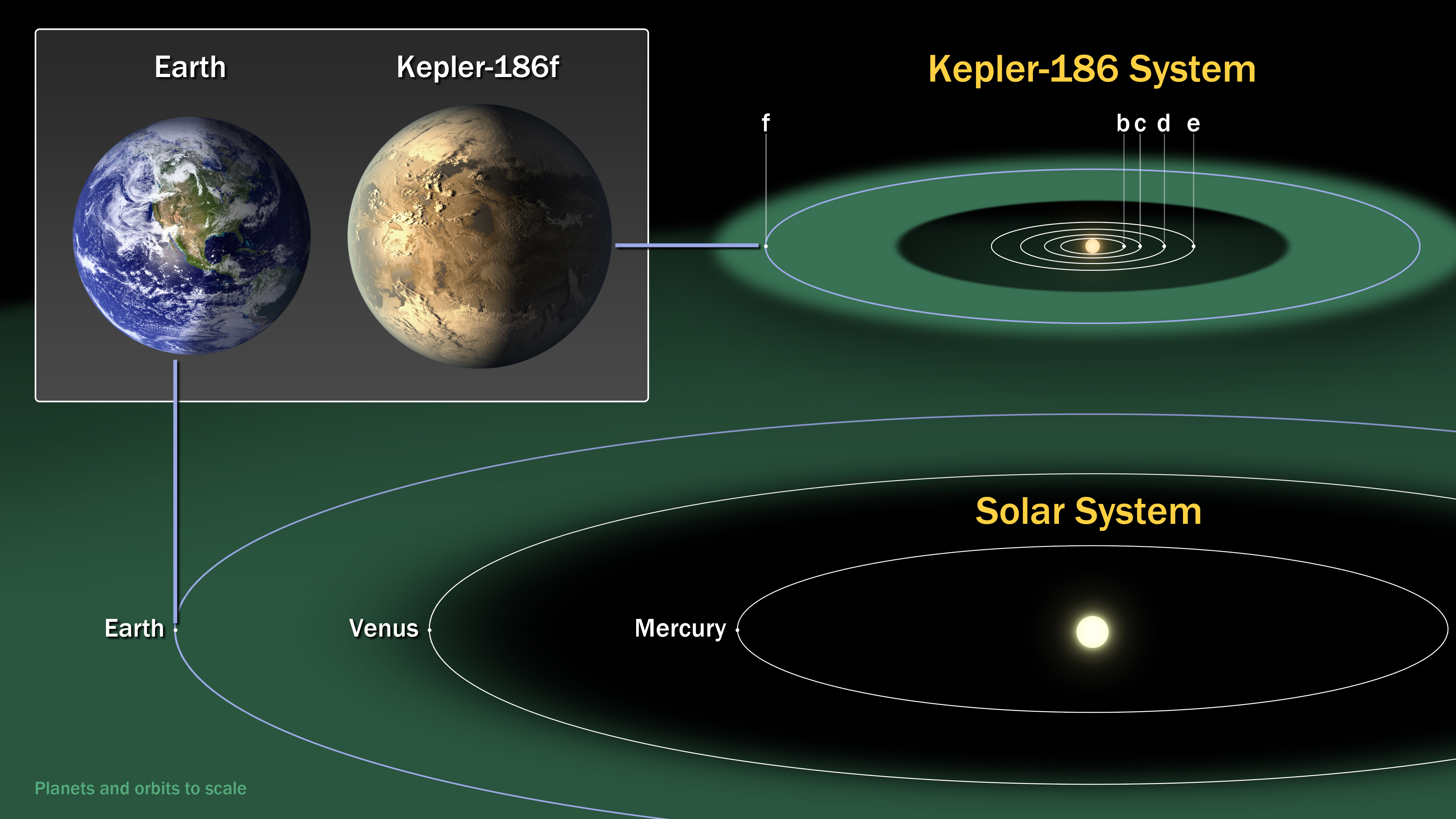
Size comparison of Kepler-186f (artist's impression) with Earth along with their projected habitable zones

The five planets discovered around Kepler-186 are all expected to have a solid surface. The smallest one, Kepler-186b, is only 8% larger than Earth, while the largest one, Kepler-186d, is almost 40% larger.

The four innermost planets are probably tidally locked, but Kepler-186f is farther out, where the star's tidal effects are much weaker, so there may not have been enough time for its spin to slow down that much. Because of the very slow evolution of red dwarf stars, the age of the Kepler-186 system is poorly constrained, although it is likely to be greater than a few billion years. There is a roughly 50% chance it is tidally locked. Since it is closer to its star than Earth is to the Sun, it will probably rotate much more slowly than Earth; its day could be weeks or months long (see Tidal effects on rotation rate, axial tilt and orbit).

Planetary formation simulations have also shown that there could be one additional non-transiting low-mass planet between Kepler-186e and Kepler-186f. If this planet exists, it is likely not much more massive than Earth. If it were, its gravitational influence would likely prevent Kepler-186f from transiting. Conjectures involving the Titius–Bode law, (and the related Dermott's law) indicate that there could be several remaining planets to be found in the system - two small ones between e and f and another larger one outside of f. That hypothetical outer planet must have an orbital radius beyond 16.4 AU for planetary system to remain stable.

The low metallicity of the star at a metallicity (dex) of -0.26, or to put it another way, about half that of the Sun's, is associated with a decreased chance of planets overall and giant planets specifically but an increased chance of Earth sized planets, in a general study of stars.

== See also ==
- Kepler-62
- Gliese 667
- TRAPPIST-1
- Proxima Centauri b
- K-type main-sequence star
- Red dwarf
- Kepler-442
- Barnard's Star
