= Kepler-186b =

Terrestrial exoplanet orbiting Kepler-186

Discovery
- Discovered by: Jason F. Rowe et al.
- Discovery site: Kepler Space Observatory
- Discovery date: 26 February 2014
- Detection method: Transit

Orbital characteristics
- Semi-major axis: 0.0343 (± 0.0046) AU
- Orbital period (sidereal): 3.8867907 d 0.010641 y
- Inclination: 83.56
- Star: Kepler-186

Physical characteristics
- Mean radius: 1.07 (± 0.12) R_{🜨}
- Temperature: T_{eq}: 666 K (393 °C; 739 °F)

Kepler-186b (also known as KOI-571.03) is an exoplanet located around 582 light-years away from Earth. Kepler-186b orbits a red dwarf known as Kepler-186, named after the space telescope that found it.

== Physical characteristics ==
=== Orbit ===
Kepler-186b is the innermost planet and the smallest of its system, and thus not suitable for life. The orbital period of this planet is just under four Earth days long due to its location near the parent star.

It is tidally locked. As a result, one hemisphere is in eternal daylight while the other hemisphere is in endless darkness.

The other planets in the system are Kepler-186c, d, e, and f, of which only Kepler-186f is within the habitable zone.
