= KOI-81 =

Eclipsing binary system

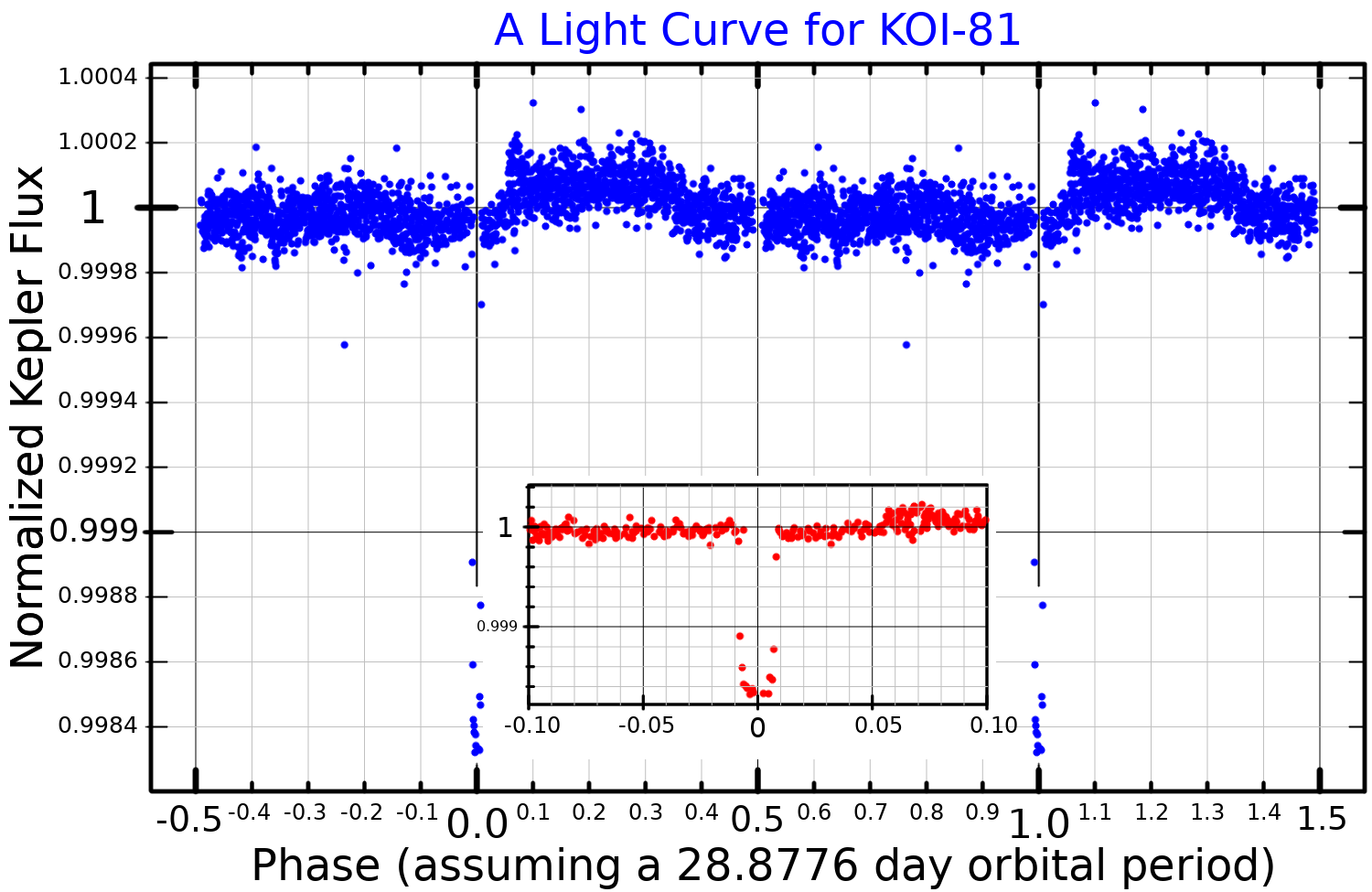
- A light curve for KOI-81, adapted from van Kerkwijk et al. (2010). The inset plot shows the eclipse on an expanded scale.

Observation data Epoch J2000 Equinox J2000
- Constellation: Cygnus
- Right ascension: 19^{h} 35^{m} 08.576^{s}
- Declination: +45° 01′ 06.46″
- Apparent magnitude (V): 11.349

Characteristics
- Evolutionary stage: main sequence + subdwarf
- Spectral type: B9-A0V
- B−V color index: 0.204

Astrometry
| Radial velocity (R_{v}) | −21.02±0.13 km/s |
| Proper motion (μ) | RA: +0.318 mas/yr Dec.: −2.541 mas/yr |
| Parallax (π) | 0.5633±0.0302 mas |
| Distance | 5,800 ± 300 ly (1,780 ± 100 pc) |

Orbit
| Period (P) | 23.8760923 days |
| Eccentricity (e) | 0 (assumed) |
| Inclination (i) | 88.97° |
| Semi-amplitude (K_{1}) (primary) | 6.74 km/s |
| Semi-amplitude (K_{2}) (secondary) | 101.18 km/s |

Details

primary
| Mass | 2.916 M_{☉} |
| Radius | 2.447 R_{☉} |
| Luminosity | 77.3±9.6 L_{☉} |
| Surface gravity (log g) | 4.13 cgs |
| Temperature | 11,700 K |
| Rotational velocity (v sin i) | 296 km/s |

subdwarf
| Mass | 0.194 M_{☉} |
| Radius | 0.0911 R_{☉} |
| Luminosity | 0.9±0.4 L_{☉} |
| Surface gravity (log g) | 5.81 cgs |
| Temperature | >19,400 K |
| Rotational velocity (v sin i) | <10 km/s |

Other designations
- KIC 8823868, 2MASS J19350857+4501065, GSC2.3 N2K9001230

Database references
| SIMBAD | data |

KOI-81 is an eclipsing binary star in the constellation of Cygnus. The primary star is a late B-type or early A-type main-sequence star with a temperature of 10,000 K (9,700 °C; 17,500 °F). It lies in the field of view of the Kepler Mission and was determined to have an object in orbit around it which is smaller and hotter than the main star.

== KOI-81b ==
KOI-81b is a hot compact object orbiting KOI-81. It was discovered in 2010 by the Kepler Mission and came to attention because of its small size and high temperature of 17,000 K (16,700 °C; 30,100 °F). The orbit of KOI-81b around the main star takes 23.8776 days to complete. Analysis of relativistic effects in the Kepler light curve suggests that it is a low-mass white dwarf of approximately 0.3 solar masses, or the immediate progenitor of such a white dwarf, a hot subdwarf. This small hot star was produced by mass transfer when the primary stripped the outer layers when the secondary expanded after leaving the main sequence.

== See also ==
- KOI-74, a similar system also discovered by the Kepler Mission.
- Kepler Object of Interest, stars observed to have transits by the Kepler Mission
