= Kepler-296 =

Star in the constellation Draco

Observation data Epoch J2000 Equinox J2000
- Constellation: Draco
- Right ascension: 19^{h} 06^{m} 09.60253^{s}
- Declination: +49° 26′ 14.3969″

Characteristics
- Spectral type: K7 V + M1 V

Astrometry
Proper motion (μ)	RA: 2.635 mas/yr Dec.: −16.375 mas/yr
Parallax (π)	4.5538±0.5562 mas
Distance	approx. 720 ly (approx. 220 pc)

Details

Kepler-296 A
Mass	0.498+0.067 −0.087 M_{☉}
Radius	0.480+0.066 −0.087 R_{☉}
Surface gravity (log g)	4.774+0.091 −0.059 cgs
Temperature	3740±130 K
Metallicity [Fe/H]	−0.08+0.28 −0.30 dex

Kepler-296 B
Mass	0.326+0.070 −0.079 M_{☉}
Radius	0.322+0.060 −0.068 R_{☉}
Surface gravity (log g)	4.993+0.087 −0.063 cgs
Temperature	3440±75 K
Metallicity [Fe/H]	−0.08+0.28 −0.30 dex

Other designations
- Kepler-296, KOI-1422, KIC 11497958, 2MASS J19060960+4926143

Database references
SIMBAD	data
Exoplanet Archive	data
KIC	data

Kepler-296 is a binary star system in the constellation Draco. The primary star appears to be a late K-type main-sequence star, while the secondary is a red dwarf.

== Planetary system ==
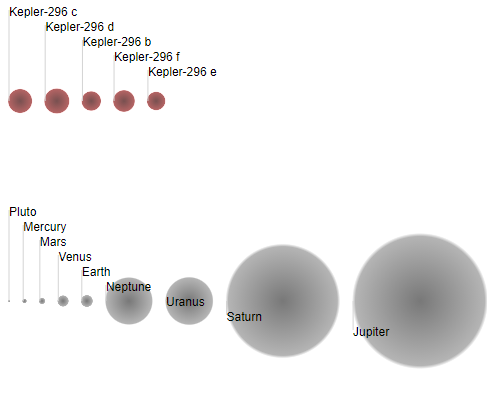
The following plot shows the approximate sizes of the planets in this system compared to planets in the Solar System.

Five exoplanets have been detected around the system; all are believed to be orbiting the primary star rather than its dimmer companion. Two planets in particular, Kepler-296e and Kepler-296f, are likely located in the habitable zone. For the planetary system to remain stable, no additional giant planets can be located up to orbital radius 10.1 AU.

The Kepler-296 A planetary system
Companion (in order from star)	Mass	Semimajor axis (AU)	Orbital period (days)	Eccentricity	Inclination	Radius
c	—	0.0521+0.0088 −0.0086	5.8416366±0.000010	<0.33	—	2.00+0.33 −0.32 R_{🜨}
b	—	0.079±0.013	10.864384+0.000051 −0.000046	<0.33	—	1.61+0.29 −0.27 R_{🜨}
d	—	0.118±0.020	19.850291+0.000061 −0.000057	<0.33	—	2.09+0.33 −0.32 R_{🜨}
e	—	0.169+0.029 −0.028	34.14211±0.00025	<0.33	—	1.53+0.27 −0.25 R_{🜨}
f	—	0.255+0.043 −0.042	63.33627+0.00060 −0.00062	<0.33	—	1.80+0.31 −0.30 R_{🜨}

== See also ==
- Habitability of red dwarf systems
- List of potentially habitable exoplanets
