= Kepler-296d =

Exoplanet Kepler 296 d

Discovery
- Discovered by: Kepler spacecraft
- Discovery date: 2014
- Detection method: Transit

Orbital characteristics
- Semi-major axis: 0.118 AU
- Eccentricity: <0.33
- Orbital period (sidereal): 19.9 d
- Star: Kepler-296

Physical characteristics
- Mean radius: 2.09 Earth radii
- Mass: 5.02 Earth masses

Kepler-296d is an exoplanet orbiting the M-dwarf star Kepler-296, located in the constellation Draco. It was discovered in 2014 by the Kepler space telescope using the transit method.

== Characteristics ==
Kepler-296d has a radius approximately 2.09 times that of Earth and a mass estimated at 5.02 Earth masses, placing it in the category of Neptune-like exoplanets. The planet orbits its host star every 19.9 days at a distance of approximately 0.118 AU. Its orbit has an eccentricity of less than 0.33.

== Host Star ==
The host star, Kepler-296, is an M-type dwarf. These stars are cooler and smaller than the Sun, and often host multiple exoplanets. Kepler-296 is known to host at least five planets.

== Discovery ==
Kepler-296d was identified in 2014 as part of the data collected by NASA's Kepler space telescope, which monitored the brightness of over 150,000 stars to detect periodic dips in light indicative of planetary transits. The detection of Kepler-296d was achieved through the transit method, wherein a planet passes between its host star and the observer, causing a measurable decrease in the star’s apparent brightness.

== See also ==
- List of exoplanets discovered in 2014
- Exoplanet
