= HAT-P-7b =

Super Jupiter orbiting HAT-P-7

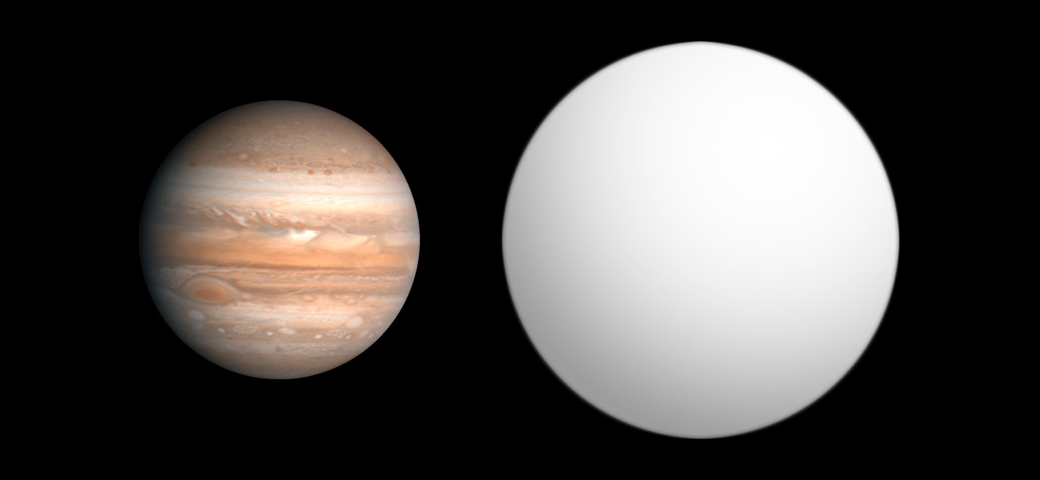
- Size comparison of HAT-P-7b (gray) with Jupiter

Discovery
- Discovered by: HATNet Project
- Discovery site: HAT-7 telescope at Fred Lawrence Whipple Observatory and HAT-8 at Mauna Kea Observatory
- Discovery date: March 5, 2008
- Detection method: Transit

Designations
- Alternative names: Kepler-2b, KOI-2.01

Orbital characteristics
- Semi-major axis: 0.03813±0.00036 AU
- Eccentricity: <0.0040
- Orbital period (sidereal): 2.204737±0.000017 d
- Inclination: 85.7^{+3.5}_{−3.1}
- Star: HAT-P-7

Physical characteristics
- Mean radius: 1.64±0.11 R_{J}
- Mass: 1.806±0.036 M_{J}
- Mean density: 0.54 g cm^{−3}
- Surface gravity: 17.36 m/s^{2} (57.0 ft/s^{2}); 1.77 g
- Temperature: 2,730^{+150}_{−100} K

HAT-P-7b (or Kepler-2b) is an extrasolar planet discovered in 2008. It orbits very close to its host star and is larger than Jupiter. Due to the extreme heat that it receives from its star, the dayside temperature is predicted to be 2,630–2,880 K (2,360–2,610 °C; 4,270–4,720 °F), while nightside temperatures are 2,211–2,238 K (1,938–1,965 °C; 3,520–3,569 °F). HAT-P-7b is also one of the darkest planets ever observed, with an albedo of less than 0.03—meaning it absorbs more than 97% of the visible light that strikes it. The planet may have a retrograde orbit. Its atmosphere is thought to contain clouds of corundum, the mineral that forms rubies and sapphires.

== Discovery ==
The HATNet Project telescopes HAT-7, located at the Smithsonian Astrophysical Observatory's Fred Lawrence Whipple Observatory in Arizona, and HAT-8, installed on the rooftop of Smithsonian Astrophysical Observatory's Submillimeter Array building atop Mauna Kea, Hawaii, observed 33,000 stars in HATNet field G154, on nearly every night from late May to early August 2004. The light curves resulting from the 5,140 exposures obtained were searched for transit signals and a very significant periodic drop in brightness was detected in the star GSC 03547–01402 (HAT-P-7), with a depth of approximately 7.0 millimagnitude, a period of 2.2047 days, and a duration of 4.1 hours.

Fortunately HAT-P-7 was located in the overlapping area between fields G154 and G155 allowing the transit to be independently confirmed by the HAT-6 (Arizona) and HAT-9 (Hawaii) telescopes which observed the neighboring field G155. Field G155 was observed from late July 2004 to late September 2005 gathering an additional 11,480 exposures for a total of 16,620 data points.

== History ==
The GSC 03547-01402 system was within the initial field of view of the Kepler Mission spacecraft, which confirmed the transit and orbital properties of the planet with significantly improved confidence and observed occultation and light curve characteristics consistent with a strongly absorbing atmosphere with limited advection to the night side. In testing itself on HAT-P-7b, Kepler proved it was sensitive enough to detect Earth-like exoplanets.

On July 4, 2011, HAT-P-7b was the subject of the Hubble Space Telescope's one millionth scientific observation.

== Characteristics ==
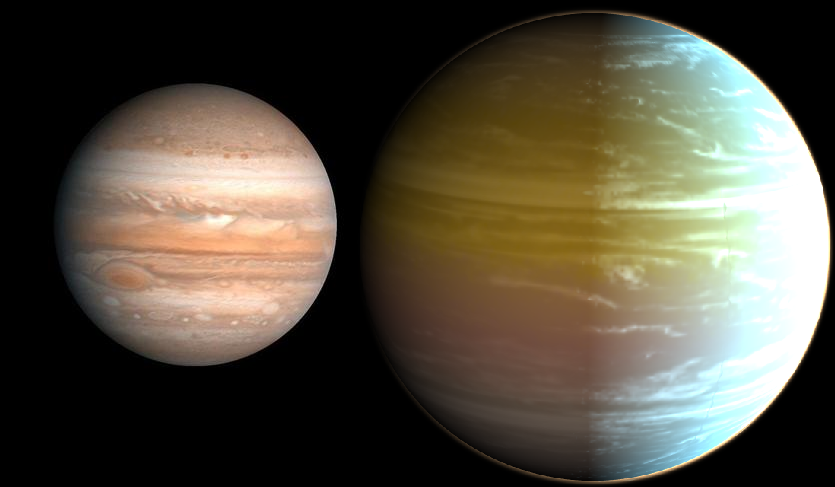
Artist impression of HAT-P-7b

In August 2009, it was announced that HAT-P-7b may have a retrograde orbit, based upon measurements of the Rossiter–McLaughlin effect. This announcement came only a day after the announcement of the first planet discovered with such an orbit, WASP-17b. A study in 2012, utilizing the Rossiter–McLaughlin effect, determined the planetary orbit inclination with respect to the rotational axis of the star, equal to 155±37°.

It is believed HAT-P-7b origined in a much wider orbit around its host star (around 3 AU) but was doomed to its current close and retograde orbit due to gravitational interactions with HAT-P-7 C, a red dwarf which orbits HAT-P-7 A at an orbital separation of 32 astronomical units in a highly eccentric orbit. HAT-P-7 A also has a wider companion, HAT-P-7 B, at a separation of 700 AU. This outer star may have started a Kozai mechanism by exciting the eccentricity of the inner companion, which on its turn excited the eccentricity of the primordial planet, until tidal forces circularized the planet's orbit and HAT-P-7b migrated to its current position.

In January 2010, it was announced that ellipsoidal light variations were detected for HAT-P-7b, the first detection of such kind. This method analyses the brightness variation caused by the rotation of a star as its shape is tidally distorted by the planet.

== Weather ==
In December 2016, a letter published in Nature Astronomy by Dr. David Armstrong and his colleagues described evidence of strong wind jets of variable speed on HAT-P-7b. High variation in wind speed would explain similar variations in light reflected from HAT-P-7b's atmosphere. In particular, the brightest point on the planet shifts its phase or position on a timescale of only tens to hundreds of days, suggesting high variation in global wind speeds and cloud coverage. Condensation models of HAT-P-7b predict precipitation of Al_{2}O_{3} (corundum) on the night side of the planet's atmosphere. The clouds themselves are likely made up of corundum, the mineral which forms rubies and sapphires.

== See also ==
- Hot Jupiter
- HAT-P-11b
