= Kepler-737b =

Mini-Neptune exoplanet orbiting Kepler-737

Discovery
- Discovered by: HARPS, Kepler space telescope
- Discovery date: May 10, 2016
- Detection method: Transit

Designations
- Alternative names: KOI-947.01, KIC 9710326 b, Gaia DR2 2126820324123177472 b

Orbital characteristics
- Semi-major axis: 0.1422 AU
- Orbital period (sidereal): 29.5992 days
- Star: Kepler-737

Physical characteristics
- Mean radius: 1.96 R_{🜨}
- Mass: ~4.5 M_{🜨}
- Mean density: ~3.3 g/cm^{3}
- Temperature: 298 K (25 °C; 77 °F)

Kepler-737b is a super-Earth exoplanet 669 light years away. There is a chance it could be on the inner edge of the habitable zone.

== Physical properties ==
=== Mass, radius and temperature ===
Kepler-737b is an exoplanet with 1.96 R_{🜨} (0.175 R_{J}). Its mass is unknown, but is estimated at 4.5 M_{🜨} based on a mass-radius relationship. If the 4.5-earth mass estimate is correct, this gives the planet an approximate density of 3.3 times that of water, giving it the possibility of being a mini-Neptune or, more favorable to habitability, a water world. Due to its stellar flux 121% that of Venus, it may be a smaller version of GJ 1214b, a classic superpressured water world. The planet's equilibrium temperature is 298 K (25 °C).

=== Star ===
The star's designations include Kepler-737 and KOI-947. It is an early M-star. The mass is 0.51 solar masses and its radius is 0.48 times that of the Sun. The temperature of the star is 3813 K and its metallicity is -0.24, significantly lower than the Sun's. The host star's age is 3.89 billion years, 680 million years younger than the Sun.

=== Orbit ===
Kepler-737b orbits its star once every 28.5992 days. It may be within the inner part of the habitable zone, depending on the habitable zone model used. The conservative model/models place it over 1 Earth flux level outside of the habitable zone, but some very optimistic models place it inside the far inner section of the extended habitable zone. If it is not a mini-Neptune, then it might have a small chance of being habitable. It would be substantially hotter than Earth, due to its stellar flux 2.297 times that of Earth, greater than that of Venus, and resulting equilibrium temperature of 298 K (25 °C; 77 °F).

== Discovery ==
Kepler-737b is a confirmed exoplanet that was found by Kepler using the transit method. It was confirmed on May 10, 2016.

=== Nomenclature ===
Kepler-737b is also known as KOI-947.01, KIC 9710326 b, and Gaia DR2 2126820324123177472 b. KOI means "Kepler Object of Interest" and KIC means "Kepler Input Catalog". Gaia is a European satellite that was launched on December 19, 2013.

== Habitability ==
With a stellar flux 2.297 times that of Earth, greater than that of Venus, Kepler-737b is unlikely to be habitable. However, Kepler-737b is considered to be in the habitable zone by the Open Exoplanet Catalogue, based on an extremely optimistic habitable zone model that also places Venus in the habitable zone. Due to its equilibrium temp. of 298 K, with and earth-like GE it would be about sixty degrees Celsius, and with twice its GE, ninety degrees. It is likely tidally locked due to its short orbit; a tidally locked planet would have one side facing the star permanently while the other would be in constant darkness. If Kepler-737b has little or no atmosphere, this could make one side too hot to live on, and the other too cold. However, there may be a "sweet spot" in between the two, where liquid water can exist. This spot would be the planet's terminator line. Kepler-737b may instead have atmospheric circulation that would distribute the heat around the planet, potentially making a large portion of it habitable, although given its stellar flux the most likely scenario is that the planet's surface is too hot to be habitable. Water on Kepler-737b's surface could also distribute heat.

Kepler-737b's density is unknown, so it could either be a rocky super-Earth or a mini-Neptune. The fact that the planet is quite likely to have no magnetic field could spark adaptations to the relatively high radiation level, such as a thick shell of a substance that could repel the radiation or tardigrade-like DNA. In most earthly creatures, DNA is damaged permanently, but with tardigrades, DNA is repairable after being damaged by deadly radiation.

There is a reduced chance of intelligent life on Kepler-737b due to the fair chance that it is a water world, with no dry land. It is likely substantially hotter than Earth, due to its stellar flux 2.297 times that of Earth and resulting equilibrium temperature of 298 K (25 °C; 77 °F). If ice caps exist, then they would likely be much smaller than Earth's, due to the temperature as well as to the possibility that Kepler-737b has more carbon dioxide in its atmosphere than Earth. (Note: Does not include all possible factors.) It would have accreted the carbon dioxide by gravity or because water worlds are likely to have a lot of carbon dioxide in their atmospheres. More carbon dioxide in an atmosphere equalizes the temperature.

== See also ==
- Kepler-186f, a habitable zone exoplanet around an early M-star.
- Ross 128 b, an exoplanet orbiting a quiet red dwarf.
- TRAPPIST-1, an ultra-cool dwarf with 7 planets, 4 of which are potentially habitable:
  - TRAPPIST-1d
  - TRAPPIST-1e
  - TRAPPIST-1f
  - TRAPPIST-1g
- Gliese 832 c, another Super-Earth exoplanet with a relatively high stellar flux and a small chance of being habitable.
- Desert planet
- Gliese 1214b, a possible water world.
- Kepler-22b, another possible water world that, unlike GJ 1214b, orbits in the habitable zone.
- Ocean world
