= Kepler-296e =

Goldilocks Earth sized exoplanet orbiting Kepler 296

Discovery
- Discovery site: Kepler Space Observatory
- Discovery date: 2014
- Detection method: Transit

Orbital characteristics
- Semi-major axis: 0.17400 AU (26,030,000 km)
- Eccentricity: <0.33
- Orbital period (sidereal): 34.14234700 d
- Inclination: 89.950
- Star: Kepler-296

Physical characteristics
- Mean radius: 1.530 R_{🜨}
- Temperature: 267 K (−6 °C; 21 °F)

Kepler-296e (also known by its Kepler Object of Interest designation KOI-1422.05) is a confirmed super-Earth exoplanet orbiting within the habitable zone of Kepler-296. The planet was discovered by NASA's Kepler spacecraft using the transit method, in which the dimming effect that a planet causes as it crosses in front of its star is measured. NASA announced the discovery of the exoplanet on 26 February 2014.

== Characteristics ==
Kepler-296e was assumed to be a super-Earth with a radius 1.75 times that of Earth. A more revised estimate puts the planet at 1.53 Earth-radii. The planet orbits Kepler-296 once every 34.1 days at a semimajor axis distance of 0.169 AU. It would have a mass of 4.52 Earth masses, with the higher-than-Earth density suggested by exoplanetkyoto. With an Earth-like density, the mass would be 3.58 Earth masses. The planet's equilibrium temperature is 267 K (–6 °C; 21 °F), much higher than that of Earth.

== Habitability ==
The planet was announced as being located within the habitable zone of Kepler-296. In this region, liquid water could exist on the surface of the planet. It is likely rocky, with its relatively low radius, in contrast to f, which is larger. As of 2017, with an ESI of 0.85, it is the fifth-most Earth-like planet after Kepler-438b, TRAPPIST-1 d, and two Gliese-designated planets, GJ 3323 b and Gliese 273 b (Luyten b) which were both discovered in 2017. The planet receives 1.4 times the Earth's solar flux, putting it well within the habitable zone and just barely beyond the runaway G line. According to Kopparapu et al. (2013), the planet is within the most conservative boundaries of the habitable zone. However, it has an eccentric orbit, with a maximum eccentricity of 0.33 to a confidence of 3-sigma. The planet's equilibrium temperature varies depending on its albedo: for a non-tidally locked planet with an Earth-like albedo of 0.3, it is 234 K (–39 °C; –38 °F), and for a Venus-like albedo of 0.7, it is 189 K (–84 °C; -119 °F). For a tidally locked planet with an Earth-like albedo of 0.3, the equilibrium temperature is 278 K (5 °C; 41 °F).

=== Tidal locking ===
According to, an Earth-size planet with eccentricity <0.1, no moons, and no obliquity orbiting at the Earth boundary within the habitable zone is tidally locked around a star with a mass of <0.42 solar masses (~M2 or later). When the Solar System is used as a yardstick, then the limit is 0.72 solar masses (~K3-4 or later). However, the orbit of planet e, is likely more eccentric than the modeled fictional planet, so the planet may not have had enough time to tidally lock.

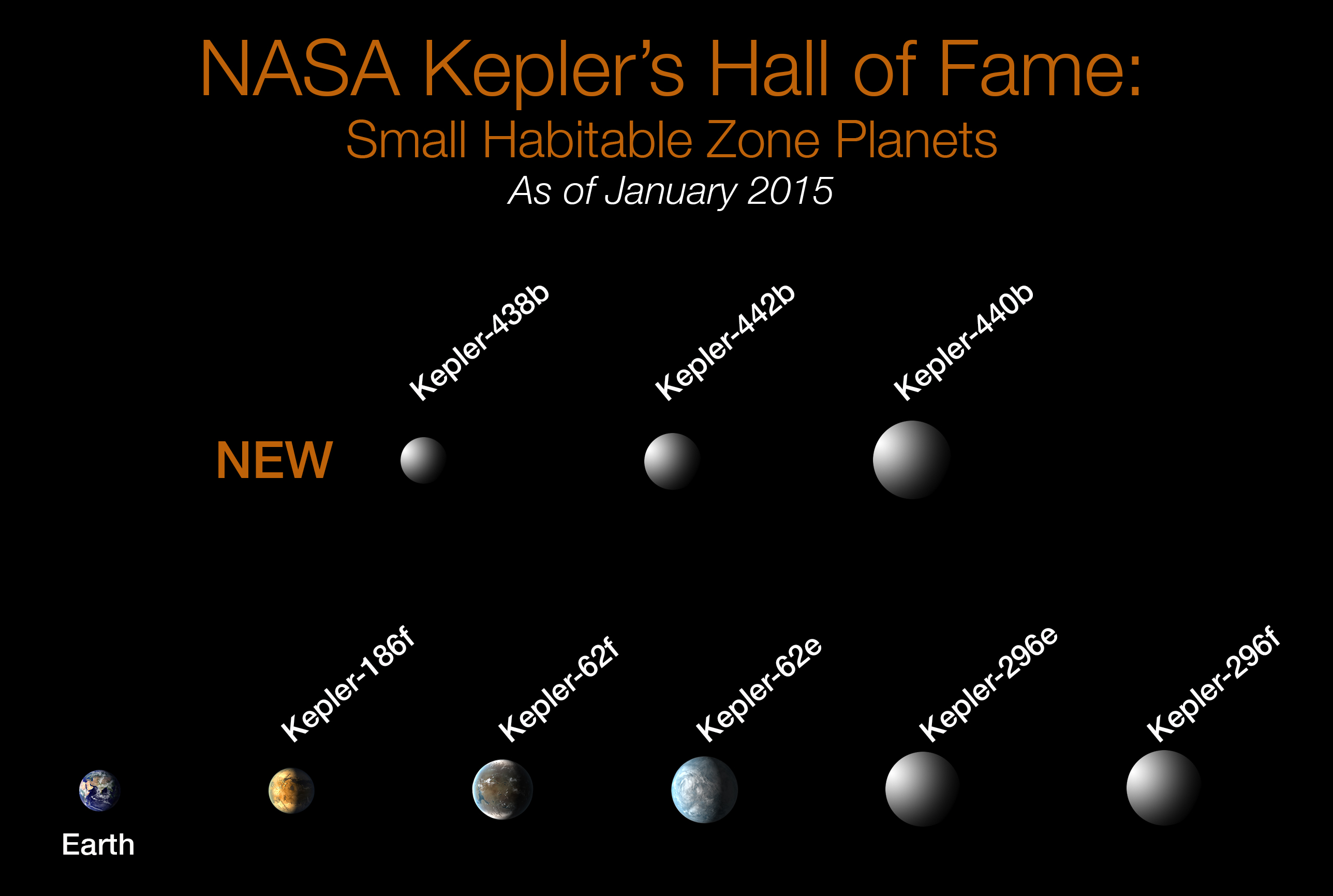

== See also ==
- Kepler-62e and f
- Habitability of red dwarf systems
- List of potentially habitable exoplanets
